A chronological list of sieges follows.

Military sieges 
A military siege is a prolonged military assault and blockade on a city or fortress with the intent of conquering by force or attrition.

Ancient

Before 1000 BC
 Siege of Aratta (c. 2600 BC)
Siege of Uruk (c. 2580 BC)
Siege of Qabra (1780 BC)
 Siege of Hiritum (1764 BC)
 Siege of Larsa (1763 BC)
 Siege of Avaris (c. 1550 BC)
 Siege of Sharuhen (c. 1530 BC)
 Siege of Megiddo (c. 1457 BC)
 Siege of Jericho (c. 1400 BC)
 Siege of Dapur (1269 BC)
 Siege of Troy (c. 1200 BC)

10th century BC
 Siege of Rabbah (10th century BC) (Bible Reference: II Samuel 11–12)
 Siege of Abel-beth-maachah (10th century BC) (Bible Reference: II Samuel 20:15–22)
 Siege of Gezer (10th century BC)
 Sack of Jerusalem (925 BC) by Egyptian pharaoh Shoshenq I

9th century BC
 Siege of Gath (city) (ca. 830 BC) (Bible Reference: II Kings 12:17/18)
 Siege of Samaria (ancient city) (9th century BC) (Bible Reference: II Kings 6:24 – 7:7)

8th century BC
 Siege of Tyre (724–720 BC) by the Assyrians under Shalmaneser V and Sargon II
 Siege of Gezer (c. 733 BC)
 Siege of Hermopolis (701 BC)
 Siege of Azekah (701 BC)
 Siege of Lachish (701 BC)
 Siege of Jerusalem (701 BC) by the Assyrians under Sennacherib
 Siege of Tyre (701 BC) by the Assyrians under Sennacherib

7th century BC
 Siege of Babylon (689 BC)
 Siege of Tyre (671 BC) by the Assyrians under Esarhaddon
 Siege of Tyre (663 BC) by the Assyrians under Ashurbanipal
 Fall of Ashdod (635 BC)
 Fall of Assur (614 BC)
 Battle of Nineveh (612 BC)
 Fall of Harran (610 BC)
 Siege of Harran (609 BC)

6th century BC
 Siege of Jerusalem (597 BC) by Nebuchadnezzar II
 Siege of Jerusalem (587 BC) by Nebuchadnezzar II
 Siege of Tyre (586–573 BC) by Nebuchadnezzar II
 Siege of Sardis (547 BC)
 Siege of Gaza (525 BC)
 Siege of Memphis (525 BC)

5th century BC

4th century BC

3rd century BC
 Siege of Messene (295 BC) – Wars of the Diadochi
 Siege of Thebes (292–291 BC)
 Siege of Athens (287 BC)
 Siege of Syracuse (278 BC) – Part of the Pyrrhic War
 Siege of Lilybaeum (278 BC) – Part of the Pyrrhic War
 Siege of Sparta (272 BC) – Pyrrhus' invasion of the Peloponnese
 Siege of Agrigentum (261 BC) – Part of the First Punic War
 Siege of Aspis (255 BC) – Part of the First Punic War
 Siege of Lilybaeum (250 BC) – Part of the First Punic War
 Siege of Drepana (249–241 BC) – Part of the First Punic War
 Battle of "The Saw" (238 BC) – Part of the Mercenary War
 Siege of Tunis (238 BC) – Part of the Mercenary War
 Siege of Medion (231 BC) – First Illyrian War
 Siege of Issa (230–229 BC) – First Illyrian War
 Siege of Epidamnus (229 BC) – First Illyrian War
 (1895)
 Siege of Saguntum (219 BC) – casus belli for the Second Punic War
 Siege of Casilinum (216–215 BC) – Second Punic War
 Siege of Petelia (215 BC) – Second Punic War
 Siege of Arpi (213 BC) – Second Punic War
 Siege of Syracuse (213–212 BC) – the Roman siege
 Siege of Capua (211 BC) – Second Punic War
 Siege of Agrigentum (210 BC) – Second Punic War
 Battle of Cartagena (209 BC) – Second Punic War
 Siege of Manduria (209 BC) – Second Punic War
 Siege of Caulonia (209 BC) – Second Punic War
 Siege of Bactra (208–206 BC)
 Siege of Utica (204 BC) – Second Punic War
 Siege of Abydos (200 BC) – Cretan War (205–200 BC)

2nd century BC
 Siege of Gythium (195 BC) – War against Nabis
 Siege of Eucratideia (169 BC)
 Siege of Carthage (149–146 BC) by Scipio Aemilianus Africanus
 Siege of Numantia (134–133 BC) by Scipio Aemilianus Africanus
 Siege of Cirta (113 BC) – Jugurthine War

1st century BC
 Siege of Athens and Piraeus (87–86 BC) – First Mithridatic War
 Siege of Mytilene (81 BC)
 Siege of Cyzicus (73 BC) – Third Mithridatic War
 Siege of Jerusalem (63 BC) by Pompey the Great
 Siege of the Atuatuci (57 BC) – Gallic Wars
 Siege of Avaricum (52 BC) – Gallic Wars
 Siege of Alesia (52 BC) – Gallic Wars
 Siege of Uxellodunum (51 BC) – Gallic Wars
 Siege of Massilia (49 BC) – Caesar's Civil War
 Siege of Utica (49 BC) – Caesar's Civil War
 Siege of Dyrrhachium (48 BC) – Caesar's Civil War
 Siege of Alexandria (48–47 BC) – Caesar's Civil War
 Siege of Jerusalem (37 BC) by Herod the Great
 Siege of Aracillum (25 BC) – Cantabrian Wars

After A. D. until 6th century

1st century 

 Siege of Uspe (49)
 Siege of Camulodunum (60–61)
 Siege of Yodfat (67) – First Jewish–Roman War
 Siege of Gush Halav (67) – First Jewish–Roman War
 Zealot Temple Siege (68) – First Jewish–Roman War
 Siege of Jerusalem (70) – the Roman siege by Titus
 Siege of Masada (72–73 or 73–74) – First Jewish–Roman War

2nd century 
 Battle of Sarmisegetusa (106) – Trajan's Dacian Wars
 Siege of Hatra (117) – Trajan's Parthian campaign
 Siege of Hatra (193) – by Septimius Severus during Roman–Parthian Wars
 Siege of Byzantium (194–196) by forces of Septimius Severus.
 Siege of Hatra (197) – by Septimius Severus during Roman–Parthian Wars

3rd century 
 Siege of Jicheng (213)
 Siege of Hatra (220s) by Sasanians under Ardashir I
 Siege of Chencang (229) – Zhuge Liang's Northern Expeditions
 Siege of Aquileia (238) – Year of the Six Emperors
 Siege of Hatra (240-241) by Sasanians under Shapur I
 Siege of Philippopolis (250)
 Siege of Thessalonica (254)
 Siege of Dura-Europos (256)
 Siege of Tyana (272)
 Siege of Palmyra (272)

4th century 
 Siege of Byzantium (324) – Civil wars of the Tetrarchy
 Siege of Nisibis (337) – Perso-Roman wars of 337–361

 Siege of Singara (344) – Perso-Roman wars of 337–361
 Siege of Nisibis (347) – Perso-Roman wars of 337–361
 Siege of Nisibis (350) – Perso-Roman wars of 337–361
 Siege of Autun (356)
 Siege of Senonae (356)
 Siege of Amida (359) – Perso-Roman wars of 337–361
 Siege of Singara (360) – Perso-Roman wars of 337–361
 Siege of Aquileia (361)
 Siege of Pirisabora (363) – Julian's Persian War
 Siege of Maiozamalcha (363) – Julian's Persian War
 Siege of Adrianople (378) – Gothic War (376–382)

5th century 
 Siege of Asti (402)
 Siege of Florence (405)
 Siege of Rome (408–410)
 Siege of Arles (411)
 Siege of Valence (411)
 Sack of Trier (413)
 Siege of Massilia (413)
 Siege of Theodosiopolis (421) – Roman–Sasanian War (421–422)
 Siege of Arles (425)
 Siege of Hippo Regius (430–431)
 Siege of Narbonne (436–437)
 Siege of Noviodunum (437)
 Siege of Viminacium (441) by Attila
 Siege of Naissus (442) by Attila
 Siege of Sirmium (442) by Attila
 Siege of Ratiaria (447) by Attila
 Siege of Metz (451) by Attila
 Siege of Aurelianum (451) by Attila
 Siege of Aquileia (452) by Attila
 Siege of Castrum Cainonense (463)
 Siege of Singidunum (472)
 Siege of Taragona (472)
 Siege of Rome (472) by Ricimer
 Siege of Papyrius (484–488)
 Siege of Ravenna (490–493) – Ostrogothic conquest of Italy
 Siege of Nisibis (498)

Medieval

6th century

7th century

8th century

 Siege of Bergamo (701)
 Siege of Taranton (702) – Arab–Byzantine Wars
 Siege of Tyana (707–708) by the Umayyads
 Siege of Anchialus (708) – Byzantine-Bulgarian Wars
 Siege of Turanda (712) – Arab–Byzantine Wars
 Siege of Constantinople (717–718) by the Umayyads
 Siege of Toulouse (721) – Umayyad invasion of Gaul
 Siege of Angers (722)
 Siege of Nicaea (727) by the Umayyads
 Siege of Kamarja (729) by the Turgesh
 Siege of Bordeaux (732) – Umayyad invasion of Gaul
 Siege of Avignon (737) – Umayyad invasion of Gaul
 Siege of Narbonne (737) – Umayyad invasion of Gaul
 Siege of Nîmes (737) – Umayyad invasion of Gaul
 Siege of Synnada (740) – Arab–Byzantine Wars
 Siege of Laon (741)
 Siege of Loches (742)
 Siege of Emesa (745) – Third Fitna
 Siege of Wasit (749–750) – Abbasid Revolution
 Siege of Melitene (750)
 Siege of Narbonne (752–59) – Umayyad invasion of Gaul
 Siege of Pavia (755)
 Siege of Rome (756)
 Siege of Pavia (756)
 Siege of Suiyang (757) - known because of acts of cannibalism.
 Siege of Sythen (758)
 Siege of Bourbon (761) – Aquitanian War
 Siege of Clermont (761) – Aquitanian War
 Siege of Chantelle (761) – Aquitanian War
 Siege of Bourges (762) – Aquitanian War
 Siege of Thouars (762) – Aquitanian War
 Siege of Kamacha (766) – Arab–Byzantine Wars
 Siege of Toulouse (767) – Aquitanian War
 Siege of Syke (771) – Arab–Byzantine Wars

 Siege of Pavia (773–774) – Lombard kingdom conquered by Charlemagne
 Siege of Syburg (775) – Saxon Wars
 Siege of Syburg (776) – Saxon Wars
 Siege of Barbād (776)
 Siege of Zaragoza (778) by Charlemagne
 Siege of Germanikeia (778) – Arab–Byzantine Wars
 Siege of Semaluos (780) – Arab–Byzantine Wars
 Siege of Nakoleia (782) – Arab–Byzantine Wars
 Siege of Huesca (797)
 Siege of Trsat (799)

9th century
 Siege of Barcelona (800–801) by Louis the Pious
 Siege of Lucera (802)
 Siege of Canburg (805)
 Siege of Patras (805 or 807) by the Slavs of the Peloponnese
 Siege of Melitene (805) – Arab–Byzantine Wars
 Siege of Heraclea (806) – Arab–Byzantine Wars
 Siege of Tortosa (809) by Louis the Pious
 Siege of Serdica (809) – Byzantine–Bulgarian wars
 Siege of Venice (810)
 Siege of Debeltos (812) – Byzantine–Bulgarian wars
 Siege of Baghdad (812–813) – Fourth Fitna
 Siege of Mesembria (812) – Byzantine–Bulgarian wars
 Siege of Adrianople (813) – Byzantine–Bulgarian wars
 Siege of Constantinople (821–822)
 Siege of Arkadiopolis (823)
 Siege of Kaysum (824) – Fourth Fitna
 Siege of Syracuse (827–828) – Muslim conquest of Sicily
 Siege and sack of Amorium (838) – Arab–Byzantine Wars
 Siege of Paris (845) – Viking expansion
 Siege of Rome (846)
 Siege of Marand (848)
 Capture of Faruriyyah (862) – Arab–Byzantine Wars
 Siege of Dowina (864)
 Siege of Baghdad (865) – Abbasid civil war (865–866)
 Siege of Ragusa (866–868) – Arab–Byzantine Wars
 Siege of Syracuse (868) – Muslim conquest of Sicily
 Siege of Dumbarton (870) – Viking expansion

 Siege of Melite (870) – Muslim conquest of Sicily
 Siege of Bari (870–871) – Frankish conquest of the Emirate of Bari
 Siege of Salerno (871–872)
 Siege of Syracuse (877–878) – Muslim conquest of Sicily
 Siege of al-Mukhtarah (881) – Zanj Rebellion
 Siege of Asselt (882) – Viking expansion
 Siege of Euripos (883) – Arab–Byzantine Wars
 Siege of Rochester (885)
 Siege of Paris (885–886) – Viking expansion
 Siege of Buttington (893) – Viking expansion
 Siege of Bergamo (894)
 Siege of Rome (896)
 Siege of Spoleto (896)
 Siege of Amida (899)

10th century

11th century

12th century
 Siege of Haifa (1100) – Crusades
 Siege of Le Mans (1100)
 Second siege of Arsuf (1101) – Crusades
 Siege of Caesarea (1101) – Crusades
 Siege of Latakia (1101–1103)
 Siege of Acre (1102) – Crusades
 Siege of Arundel (1102)
 Siege of Bridgnorth (1102)
 Siege of Jaffa (1102) – Crusades
 Siege of Tripoli (1102–1109) – Crusades
 Siege of Acre (1103) – Crusades
 Siege of Al-Rahba (1103)
 Siege of Acre (1104) – Crusades
 Siege of Takrit (sometime between 1105 and 1107) – Nizari–Seljuk conflicts
 Siege of Alamut (sometime between 1106 and 1109) – Nizari–Seljuk conflicts
 Siege of Shahdez (1107) – Nizari–Seljuk conflicts
 Siege of Nuremberg (1105)
 Siege of Cologne (1106)
 Siege of Apamea (1106) – Crusades - conflicts with the Assassins
 Siege of Apamea (September 1106) – Crusades - conflicts with the Assassins
 Siege of Malatya (1106)
 Siege of Castellum Arnaldi (1106) – Crusades
 Siege of Al-Rahba (1107)
 Siege of Hebron (1107) – Crusades
 Siege of Douai (1107)
 Siege of Dyrrhachium (1107–1108) – Byzantine–Norman wars
 Siege of Uclés (1108) – Reconquista
 Siege of Bratislava (1108)
 Siege of Sidon (1108) – Crusades
 Siege of Jableh (1109) – Crusades
 Siege of Nakło (1109)
 Siege of Głogów (1109)
 Siege of Baalbek (1110)
 Siege of Beirut (1110) – Crusades
 Siege of Novara (1110)
 Siege of Sidon (1110) – Norwegian Crusade
 Siege of Atarib (1110) – Crusades
 Siege of Le Puiset (1111)
 Siege of Vetula (1111) – Crusades
 Siege of Tyre (1111–1112) – Crusades
 Siege of Nicaea (1113) – Byzantine–Seljuq wars
 Siege of Hornburg Castle (1113)
 Siege of Mousson (1113)
 Siege of Bar (1113)
 Siege of Cologne (1114)
 Siege of Kafartab (1115) – Crusades
 Siege of Jaffa (1115) – Crusades
 Siege of Marqab (1116) – Crusades
 Siege of Alamut (1117–1118) – Nizari–Seljuk conflicts
 Siege of Lambsar (1117–1118) – Nizari–Seljuk conflicts
 Siege of Laodicea (1119) – Byzantine–Seljuq wars
 Siege of Sozopolis (1120) – Byzantine–Seljuq wars
 Siege of Jerash (1121) – Crusades
 Siege of Mainz (1121)
 Siege of Tbilisi (1121–1122) – Georgian–Seljuk wars
 Siege of Aschaffenburg Castle (1122)
 Siege of Faulquemont Castle (1122)
 Siege of Zardana (1122) – Crusades
 Siege of Balis (1122) – Crusades
 Siege of Kharput (1123) – Crusades
 Siege of Jaffa (1123) – Crusades
 Siege of Schulenburg Castle (1123)
 Siege of Manbij (1124)
 Siege of Azaz (1124) – Crusades
 Siege of Tyre (1124) – Crusades
 Siege of Aleppo (1124–1125) – Crusades
 Siege of Raffaniya (1126) – Crusades
 Siege of Al-Rahba (1127)
 Siege of Bayonne (1130–1131)
 Siege of De'an (1132) – Jin–Song Wars
 Siege of Kastamone (1132)
 Siege of Kastamone (1133)
 Siege of Savur (1134) – Crusades
 Siege of Gangra (1135)
 Siege of Montferrand (1137) – Crusades
 Siege of Anazarbos (1137) – Crusades
 Siege of Vahka (1137) – Crusades
 Siege of Antioch (1137) – Crusades
 Siege of Kafartab (1138) – Crusades
 Siege of Aleppo (1138) – Crusades
 Siege of Shaizar (1138) – Crusades
 Siege of Buza'a (1138) – Crusades
 Siege of Coria (1138) – Reconquista
 Siege of Baalbek (1139)
 Siege of Oreja (1139) – Reconquista
 Siege of Neocaesarea (1139–1140)
 Siege of Weinsberg (1140)
 Siege of Banias (1140) – Crusades
 Siege of Coria (1142) – Reconquista
 Siege of Lisbon (1142) - Reconquista
 Siege of Li Vaux Moise (1144) – Crusades

 Siege of Edessa (1144) – Crusades
 Siege of Al-Bira (1144) – Crusades
 Siege of Edessa (1146) – Crusades
 Siege of Almería (1147) – Reconquista
 Siege of Lisbon (1147) – Reconquista
 Siege of Tortosa (1148) – Reconquista
 Siege of Damascus (1148) – Second Crusade
 Siege of Turbessel (1150) – Crusades
 Siege of Jerusalem (1152) – Crusades
 Siege of Ascalon (1153) – Crusades
 Siege of Braničevo (1154)
 Siege of Tortona (1155)
 Siege of Brindisi (1155–1156)
 Siege of Shirakawa-den (1156)
 Siege of Baghdad (1157)
 Siege of Banias (1157) – Crusades
 Siege of Shaizar (1157) – Crusades
 Siege of Casalia (1157–1158) – Crusades
 Siege of Harim (1158) – Crusades
 Siege of Milan (1158) – Part of the wars between Holy Roman Emperor Frederick I and the Northern Italy cities
 Siege of Crema (1159–1160) – Part of the wars between Holy Roman Emperor Frederick I and the Northern Italy cities
 Siege of Sanjō Palace (1160) – the main action of the Heiji Rebellion took place in Kyoto
 Siege of Ani (1161) – Georgian–Seljuk wars
 Siege of Milan (1161–62) – Part of the wars between Holy Roman Emperor Frederick I and the Northern Italy cities
 Siege of Harim (1164)
 Siege of Banias (1164)
 Siege of Alexandria (1167) – Crusader invasions of Egypt
 Siege of Wexford (1169) – the first major clash of the Norman invasion of Ireland
 Siege of Damietta (1169) – Crusader invasions of Egypt
 Siege of Kerak (1170) – Crusades
 Siege of Sinjar (1170)
 Siege of Kerak (1173) – Crusades
 Siege of Derbent (1173) – Caspian expeditions of the Rus'
 Siege of Alexandria (1174)
 Siege of Alessandria (1174–1175) – Part of the wars between Holy Roman Emperor Frederick I and the Northern Italy cities
 Siege of Homs (1175)
 Siege of Montferrand (1175)
 Siege of Sinjar (1175)
 Siege of Azaz (1176)
 Siege of Masyaf (1176)
 Siege of Harim (1177) – Crusades
 Siege of Demmin (1177) – Brandenburg–Pomeranian conflict
 Siege of Claudiopolis (1179) – Byzantine–Seljuq wars
 Siege of Jacob's Ford (1179) – Crusades
 Siege of Nara (1180) – Genpei War
 Siege of Beirut (1182) – Crusades
 Siege of Mosul (1182
 Siege of Amida (1183)
 Siege of Hiuchi (1183) – Genpei War
 Siege of Fukuryūji (1183) – Genpei War
 Siege of Tell Khalid (1183)
 Siege of Kerak (1183) – Crusades
 Siege of Hōjūjidono (1184) – Genpei War
 Siege of Santarém (1184)
 Siege of Kerak (1184) – Crusades
 Sack of Thessalonica (1185) by the Normans
 Siege of Mayyafariqin (1185)
 Siege of Lovech (1187)
 Siege of Kerak (1187) – Crusades
 Siege of Tiberias (1187) – Crusades
 Siege of Toron (1187) – Crusades
 Siege of Ascalon (1187) – Crusades
 Siege of Jerusalem (1187) – Crusades
 Siege of Tyre (1187) – Crusades
 Siege of Saone (1188) – Crusades
 Siege of Shughr-Bakas (1188) – Crusades
 Siege of Bourzey (1188) – Crusades

 Siege of Trapessac (1188) – Crusades
 Siege of Baghras (1188) – Crusades
 Siege of Safed (1188) – Crusades
 Siege of Belvoir (1188) – Crusades
 Siege of Acre (1189–1191) – Third Crusade
 Siege of Naples (1191)
 Siege of Jaffa (1192) – Third Crusade
 Siege of Verneuil (1194)
 Siege of Loches (1195)
 Siege of Aumâle (1196)
 Siege of Jaffa (1197) – Crusades
 Siege of Toron (1197–1198) – Crusade of 1197
 Siege of Châlus (1199)
 Siege of Montferrand (1199)

13th century

 Siege of Varna (1201) – Byzantine-Bulgarian Wars
 Siege of Zadar (1202) – Part of the Fourth Crusade
 Siege of Constantinople (1203) – Part of the Fourth Crusade
 Siege of Château Gaillard (1203–1204) – French invasion of Normandy (1202–1204)
 Siege of Constantinople (1204) – Part of the Fourth Crusade
 Siege of Trebizond (1205–1206) – Byzantine–Seljuk Wars
 Siege of Cologne (1205–1206) – German throne dispute
 Siege of Tripoli (1207) – Crusades
 Siege of Antalya (1207) – Byzantine–Seljuk Wars
 Siege of Beverin (1208) – Livonian Crusade
 Siege of Carcassonne (1209) – Albigensian Crusade
 Siege of Bram (1210) – Albigensian Crusade
 Siege of Al-Dāmūs (1210) – Reconquista
 Siege of Cēsis (1210) – Livonian Crusade
 Siege of Minerve (1210) – Albigensian Crusade
 Siege of Termes (1210) – Albigensian Crusade
 Siege of Montferrand (1211) – Albigensian Crusade
 Siege of Toulouse (1211) – Albigensian Crusade
 Siege of Castelnaudary (1211) – Albigensian Crusade
 Siege of Beverin (1211) – Livonian Crusade
 Siege of Viljandi (1211) – Livonian Crusade
 Siege of Weissensee (1212) – German throne dispute
 Siege of Ganja (1213)
 Siege of Sinope (1214) – Byzantine–Seljuk Wars
 Siege of Zhongdu (1215) – Genghis Khan conquers Zhongdu, now Beijing
 Siege of Rochester castle (1215) – King John's Danish mercenaries attempt to take the castle of Rochester during the First Baron's war.
 Siege of Beaucaire (1216) – Albigensian Crusade
 Siege of Dover Castle (1216) – First Barons' War
 Siege of Windsor Castle (1216) – First Barons' War
 Siege of Hertford (1216) – First Barons' War

 Siege of Lincoln Castle (1217) – First Barons' War
 Siege of Toulouse (1217–18) – Albigensian Crusade
 Siege of Mount Tabor (1218) – Crusades
 Siege of Damietta (1218) – Fifth Crusade
 Siege of Marmande (1219) – Albigensian Crusade
 Siege of Toulouse (1219) – Albigensian Crusade
 Siege of Caesarea (1220) – Crusades
 Siege of Castelnaudary (1220–1221) – Albigensian Crusade
 Siege of Bamyan (1221) – Mongol conquest of Khwarezmia
 Siege of Nishapur (1221) – Mongol conquest of Khwarezmia
 Siege of Reval (1221) – Livonian Crusade
 Siege of Trebizond (1222–1223) – Byzantine–Seljuk Wars
 Siege of Reval (1223) – Livonian Crusade
 Siege of Fellin (1223) – Livonian Crusade
 Siege of Reval (1223) – Livonian Crusade
 Siege of Lohu (1223–1224) – Livonian Crusade
 Siege of La Rochelle (1224)
 Siege of Tartu (1224) – Livonian Crusade
 Siege of Jaén (1225) – Reconquista
 Siege of Avignon (1226) – Albigensian Crusade
 Siege of Toulouse (1226) – Albigensian Crusade
 Siege of Akhlat (1229)
 Siege of Jaén (1230) – Reconquista
 Siege of Beirut (1231–1232)
 Siege of Amida (1232)
 Siege of Kaifeng (1232–1233) – Mongol conquest of the Jin dynasty
 Siege of Burriana (1233) – Reconquista
 Siege of Caizhou (1233–1234) – Mongol conquest of the Jin dynasty

 Siege of Constantinople (1235) – a joint Bulgarian-Nicaean siege on the capital of the Latin Empire.
 Siege of Bilär (1236) – Mongol invasion of Volga Bulgaria
 Siege of Córdoba (1236) – Reconquista
 Siege of Ryazan (1237) – Mongol invasion of Rus'
 Siege of Kolomna (1237–1238) – Mongol invasion of Rus'
 Siege of Moscow (1238) – Mongol invasion of Rus'
 Siege of Vladimir (1238) – Mongol invasion of Rus'
 Siege of Kozelsk (1238) – Mongol invasion of Rus'
 Siege of Brescia (1238) – Part of the wars between Holy Roman Emperor Frederick II and the Lombard League
Siege of Mt. Tebulosmta (1238-1250) - Mongol invasions of Durdzuketia
 Siege of Faenza (1239) – Part of the wars between Holy Roman Emperor Frederick II and the Lombard League
 Siege of Jerusalem (1239) – Crusades
 Siege of Kiev (1240) – Mongol invasion of Rus'
 Siege of Esztergom (1242) – First Mongol invasion of Hungary, Citadel of Esztergom,Turoc, Nyitra, Győr, Pannonhalma, Székesfehérvár, Segesd, Varasd, Kemlék, Csázma, Zágráb, Trogir, Veszprém, Tihany, Moson, Sopron, Vasvár, Zala, Léka, Pozsony, Komárom, Fülek and Abaújvár besieged but successfully resisted
 Siege of Viterbo (1243) – Part of the wars between Holy Roman Emperor Frederick II and the Lombard League
 Siege of Montségur (1243–1244) – Albigensian Crusade
 Siege of Jerusalem (1244) by the Khwarezmians
 Siege of Damascus (1245)
 Siege of Jaén (1245–46) – Reconquista
 Siege of Ascalon (1247) – Crusades
 Siege of Parma (1247–1248) – Part of the wars between Holy Roman Emperor Frederick II and the Lombard League
 Siege of Seville (1247–1248) – Reconquista
 Siege of Aachen (1248)
 Siege of Homs (1248–1249)
 Siege of Damietta (1249) – Seventh Crusade
 Siege of Naples (1252)
 Siege of Cologne (1252)

 Siege(s) of Gerdkuh (1253–1270) - Mongol campaign against the Nizaris
 Siege of Mehrin (1253)
 Siege of Tun (1253)
 Siege of Tun (1256)
 Siege of Maymun-Diz (1256)
 Siege of Alamut (1256)
 Siege of Lambsar (1256–1257)
 Siege of Cologne (1257)

 Siege of Baghdad (1258)
 Siege of Mayyafariqin (1258–1259)
 Siege of Diaoyu Castle (1259) – Mongol conquest of the Song dynasty
 Siege of Al-Bira (1259) – Mongol invasions of the Levant
 Siege of Aleppo (1260)
 Siege of Constantinople (1260) – Nicaean–Latin wars
 Siege of Cologne (1262)
 Siege of Königsberg (1262–1265) – Prussian uprisings
 Siege of Bartenstein (1264) – Prussian uprisings
 Siege of al-Bira (1264–1265) – Mongol invasions of the Levant
 Fall of Arsuf (1265)
 Siege of Kenilworth (1266) – Second Barons' War
 Siege of Safed (1266)
 Siege of Xiangyang (1267–1273) – Mongol conquest of the Song dynasty
 Siege of Antioch (1268)

 Fall of Krak des Chevaliers (1271)
 Siege of Tripoli (1271)
 Siege of Al-Bira (1272) – Mongol invasions of the Levant
 Siege of Al-Rahba (1272) – Mongol invasions of the Levant
 Siege of Al-Bira (1275) – Mongol invasions of the Levant
 Siege of Algeciras (1278–1279) – Reconquista
 Siege of Berat (1280–1281)
 Siege of Trebizond (1282)
 Siege of Albarracín (1284)
 Siege of Acre (1291)
 Capture of Berwick (1296) – First War of Scottish Independence
 Siege of Lille (1297) – Franco-Flemish War
 Siege of Damascus (1299–1300) – Mongol invasions of the Levant

14th century
 Siege of Ruad (1302)
Siege of Buda by Charles I. (1302)
 Siege of Stirling Castle (1304) – First War of Scottish Independence
 Siege of Rhodes (1306–1310) 
Siege of Buda by Charles I. (1307) 
 Siege of Gibraltar (1309) – First siege of Gibraltar, by Juan Alfonso de Guzman el Bueno in the Reconquista
 Siege of Algeciras (1309–10) – Reconquista
 Siege of Almería (1309) – Reconquista
 Siege of Warangal (1310)
 Siege of Florence (1312)
 Siege of Al-Rahba (1312–1313) – Mongol invasions of the Levant
 Siege of Roxburgh (1314) – First War of Scottish Independence
 Second siege of Gibraltar (1315) – Second siege of Gibraltar, by the Nasrid caid Yahya in the Reconquista
 Siege of Carlisle (1315) – First War of Scottish Independence
 Siege of Christmemel (1315) – Lithuanian Crusade
 Siege of Warangal (1318)
 Siege of Berwick (1318) – First War of Scottish Independence
 Siege of Padua (1319–1320), by Cangrande I della Scala, lord of Verona
 Siege of Bursa (1320–1326) – Byzantine-Ottoman Wars
 Siege of Warangal (1323)
 Siege of Villa di Chiesa (1323–1324)
 Siege of Bristol (1326) – Invasion of England (1326)
 Siege of Nicaea (1328–1331) – Byzantine-Ottoman wars
 Siege of Medvėgalis (1329) – Lithuanian Crusade
 Siege of Kasagi (1331) – Genkō War
 Siege of Akasaka (1331) – Genkō War
 Third siege of Gibraltar – Third siege of Gibraltar (1333), by a Marinids army, led by Abd al-Malik in the Reconquista
 Siege of Chihaya (1333) – Genkō War
 Siege of Berwick (1333)
 Fourth siege of Gibraltar – Rourth siege of Gibraltar (1333), by King Alfonso XI of Castile in the Reconquista
 Siege of Kamakura (1333) – End of Ashikaga shogunate.
 Siege of Nicomedia (1333–1337) – Byzantine-Ottoman Wars
 Siege of Kanegasaki (1337)
 Siege of Kuromaru (1339)
 Siege of Tournai (1340) – Part of the Hundred Years' War

 Siege of Vannes (1342) – Part of the Hundred Years' War
 Siege of Hennebont (1342) – Part of the Hundred Years' War
 Siege of Algeciras (1342–1344) – Reconquista
 Siege of Caffa (1346)
 Siege of Aiguillon (1346) – Part of the Hundred Years' War
 Siege of Calais (1346–1347) – Part of the Hundred Years' War
 Siege of Calais (1349) – Part of the Hundred Years' War
 Siege of Gibraltar (1349–1350) – fifth siege of Gibraltar, by Alfonso XI in the Reconquista
 Siege of Saint-Jean-d'Angély (1351) – Part of the Hundred Years' War
 Siege of Rennes (1356–57) – War of the Breton Succession
 Siege of Chartres (1360) – Part of the Hundred Years' War
 Siege of Kaunas (1362) – Lithuanian Crusade
 Siege of León (1368)
 Siege of Algeciras (1369) – Reconquista
 Siege of Limoges (1370) – Part of the Hundred Years' War
 Siege of Gibraltar (1374) – sixth siege of Gibraltar, by the Nasrid in the Reconquista
 Siege of Philadelphia (1378–1390) – Byzantine-Ottoman Wars
 Siege of Moscow (1382)
 Siege of Sofia (1382 or 1385)
 Siege of Ypres (1383) – Despenser's Crusade
 Siege of Lisbon (1384) – 1383–1385 Portuguese interregnum
 Siege of Tbilisi (1386) – Timur's invasions of Georgia
 Siege of Isfahan (1387)
 Siege of Tarnovo (1393)
 Siege of Anjudan (1393)
 Siege of Constantinople (1394–1402) – Byzantine-Ottoman Wars

15th century 
 Siege of Sivas (1400)
 Siege of Damascus (1400)
 Siege of Smyrna (1402)
 Siege of Birtvisi (1403) – Timur's invasions of Georgia
 Siege of Mercq (1405) – Part of the Hundred Years' War
 Siege of Marienburg (1410) – in the aftermath of the Battle of Grunwald
 Siege of Constantinople (1411)– Byzantine-Ottoman Wars, during the Ottoman Interregnum
 Sixth Siege of Gibraltar (1411)
 Siege of Bourges (1412) – Armagnac–Burgundian Civil War

 Siege of Harfleur (1415) – reopening of the Hundred Years' War
 Siege of Rouen (1418–1419) – Part of the Hundred Years' War
 Siege of Đông Quan (1418–1428) – Lam Sơn uprising
 Siege of Ceuta (1419)
 Siege of Sarai (1420)
 Siege of Meaux (1421–1422) – Part of the Hundred Years' War
 Siege of Constantinople (1422) – Byzantine-Ottoman Wars
 Siege of Thessalonica (1422–1430)– Byzantine-Ottoman and Ottoman-Venetian Wars
 Siege of Golubac (1428)
 Siege of Orléans (1428–1429) – Part of the Hundred Years' War
 Siege of Inverness (1429)
 Siege of Paris (1429) – Part of the Hundred Years' War
 Siege of Malta (1429)
 Siege of Saint-Pierre-le-Moûtier – Armagnac–Burgundian Civil War
 Siege of La Charité (1429) – Armagnac–Burgundian Civil War
 Siege of Compiègne (1430) – Part of the Hundred Years' War
 Siege of Angkor (1431)
 Siege of Pouancé (1432) – Part of the Hundred Years' War
 Siege of Pilsen (1433–34) – Hussite Wars
 Siege of Gaeta (1435)
 Siege of Saint-Denis (1435) – Part of the Hundred Years' War
 Siege of Calais (1436) – Part of the Hundred Years' War
 Seventh Siege of Gibraltar (1436) – seventh siege of Gibraltar, by the count of Niebla in the Reconquista
 Siege of Tangiers (1437)

 Siege of Belgrade (1440)
 Siege of Tartas (1440–1442) – Part of the Hundred Years' War
 Siege of Novo Brdo (1440–41)
 Siege of Metz (1444)
 Siege of Rhodes (1444)
 Siege of Balkh (1447)
 Siege of Herat (1448)
 Siege of Svetigrad (1448)
 Fifth Siege of Gibraltar (1449–1450)
 Siege of Krujë (1450)
 Siege of Constantinople (1453) – Byzantine-Ottoman Wars

Early modern

15th century
 Siege of Marienburg (1454) – Thirteen Years' War (1454–66)
 Siege of Berat (1455)
 Siege of Belgrade (1456) – Part of Ottoman wars in Europe
 Siege of Deventer (1456)
 Siege of Marienburg (1457–1460) – Thirteen Years' War (1454–66)
 Siege of Roxburgh (1460)
 Siege of Trebizond (1460–1461)
 Siege of Harlech Castle (1461–68) – Part of Wars of the Roses. Longest siege in British history.
 Siege of Shahrukhiya (1461–63)
 Siege of Hostalric (1462) – Catalan Civil War
 Eighth Siege of Gibraltar (1462), by a Castilian army in the Reconquista
 Siege of Mytilene (1462)
 Siege of Barcelona (1462) – Catalan Civil War

 Siege of Jajce (1463)
 Siege of Jajce (1464)
 Siege of Barcelona (1465) – Catalan Civil War
 Ninth Siege of Gibraltar (1466–1467), by the Duke of Medina Sidonia
 Siege of Krujë (1466–67)
 Siege of Krujë (1467)
 Siege of Negroponte (1470) – Ottoman–Venetian War (1463–1479)
 Siege of Barcelona (1472), during the Catalan Civil War
 Siege of Shkodra (1474) 
 Siege of Neuss (1474–1475) – Burgundian Wars
 Siege of Burgos (1475–1476) – War of the Castilian Succession
 Siege of Neamț Citadel (1476)
 Siege of Krujë (1477–1478)
 Siege of Shkodra (1478–1479)
 Siege of Gdov (1580) – Russian-Livonian War (1480–81)
 Siege of Izborsk (1580) – Russian-Livonian War (1480–81)
 Siege of Fellin (1580) – Russian-Livonian War (1480–81)
 Siege of Izborsk (1580) – Russian-Livonian War (1480–81)
 Siege of Pskov (1580) – Russian-Livonian War (1480–81)
 Siege of Rhodes (1480) – First siege of Rhodes
 Sieges of Otranto (1480–1481)

 Siege of Hainburg (1482) – Austrian-Hungarian War (1477–1488)
 Siege of Utrecht (1483) – Second Utrecht Civil War
 Siege of Vienna (1485) – Austrian-Hungarian War (1477–1488)
 Siege of Retz (1486) – Austrian-Hungarian War (1477–1488)
 Siege of Wiener Neustadt (1487) – Austrian-Hungarian War (1477–1488)
 Siege of Málaga (1487) – Granada War
 Siege of Granada (1491–1492)
 Siege of Boulogne (1492)
 Siege of Samarkand (1494)
 Siege of Samarkand (1497)

16th century
 Siege of the Castle of Saint George (1500) – Ottoman–Venetian War (1499–1503)
 Siege of Tabriz (1501)
 Siege of Samarkand (1501)
 Siege of Smolensk (1502) – Muscovite–Lithuanian Wars
 Siege of Kabul (1504)
 Tenth Siege of Gibraltar (1506) – by the Duke of Medina Sidonia
 Siege of Anjadiva (1506)
 Siege of Cannanore (1507)
 Spanish conquest of Oran (1509)
 Siege of Padua (1509) – War of the League of Cambrai
 Siege of Gongenyama (1510)
 Spanish conquest of Tripoli (1510)
 Portuguese conquest of Goa (1510)
 Siege of Mirandola (1511) – War of the League of Cambrai
 Capture of Malacca (1511)
 Siege of Aden (1513)
 Siege of Dijon (1513) – War of the League of Cambrai
 Siege of Smolensk (1514) – Muscovite–Lithuanian Wars
 Siege of Arai (1516)
 Siege of Cairo (1517)

 Siege of Opochka (1517) – Muscovite–Lithuanian Wars
 Siege of Polotsk (1518) – Muscovite–Lithuanian Wars
 Siege of Allenstein (1521) – Polish–Teutonic War (1519–21)
 Siege of Pampeluna (1521) – Italian War of 1521–26
 Siege of Tenochtitlan (1521) – fall of the Aztec Empire.
 Siege of Mézières (1521) – Italian War of 1521–26
 Siege of Tournai (1521) – Italian War of 1521–26
 Siege of Belgrade (1521)
 Siege of Knin (1522)
 Siege of Genoa (1522) – Italian War of 1521–26
 Siege of Rhodes (1522) – Second siege of Rhodes
 Siege of Marseille (1522–1524) – Italian War of 1521–26
 Conquest of Kalmar (1523)
 Conquest of Stockholm (1523)
 Siege of Fuenterrabía (1523–1524) – Italian War of 1521–26
 Siege of Edo (1524)

 Siege of Pavia (1524–25) – Italian War of 1521–26
 Siege of Sambhal (1526)
 Siege of Calicut (1526)
 Siege of Kamakura (1526)
 Sack of Rome (1527) – War of the League of Cognac
 Siege of Naples (1528) – War of the League of Cognac
 Capture of Peñón of Algiers (1529)
 Siege of Vienna (1529) – First siege of Vienna
 Siege of Florence (1529–1530) – War of the League of Cognac
Siege of Buda (1530) by Wilhelm von Roggendorf and Bálint Török
 Siege of Diu (1531)
 Siege of Güns (1532)

 Siege of Maribor (1532)
 Siege of Coron (1532–1534)
 Siege of Baghdad (1534) – by Ottomans
 Siege of Tunis (1534)
 Conquest of Tunis (1535)
 Siege of Chittorgarh (1535)
 Siege of Cusco (1536–1537)
 Siege of Klis (1536–1537)
 Siege of Musashi-Matsuyama (1537)
 Siege of Corfu (1537) – Ottoman–Venetian War (1537–1540)
 Siege of Diu (1538)
 Siege of Castelnuovo (1539) – Ottoman–Venetian War (1537–1540)
 Siege of Koriyama (1540–1541)
Siege of Buda (1540) by Leonhard von Fels and Niklas Salm 
 Fall of Agadir (1541)
 Siege of Buda (1541) – capture of the city of Buda by the Turkish Ottoman Emperor Suleiman the Magnificent, as he invaded central Hungary
 Algiers expedition (1541)
 Siege of Uehara (1541)
 Siege of Fukuyo (1542)
 Siege of Kuwabara (1542)
 Siege of Pest (1542) – an attempt to recapture Buda from the Turks

 Siege of Perpignan (1542) – Italian War of 1542–1546
 Siege of Toda Castle (1542–1543)
 Siege of Nagakubo (1543)
 Siege of Landrecies (1543) – Italian War of 1542–1546
 Siege of Esztergom (1543)
 Siege of Nice (1543) – Italian War of 1542–1546
 Siege of Kojinyama (1544)
 Siege of Kōriyama Castle (1544)
 Siege of St. Dizier (1544) – Italian War of 1542–46
 Sieges of Boulogne (1544–46) – Italian War of 1542–46
 Siege of Ryūgasaki (1545)
 Siege of Takatō (1545)
 Siege of Kawagoe Castle (1545–1546)
 Second siege of Diu (1546)
 Siege of Uchiyama (1546)
 Siege of Shika Castle (1546–1547)
 Siege of Van (1548) – Ottoman–Safavid War (1532–55)
 Siege of Aden (1548)
 Siege of Kajiki (1549)
 Siege of Fukashi (1549)

 Siege of Beijing (1550)
 Capture of Mahdia (1550)
 Sieges of Toishi (1550–51)
 Siege of Gozo (1551)
 Siege of Mirandola (1551–1552) – Italian War of 1551–1559 
 Siege of Tripoli (1551)
 Siege of Eger (1552)
 Siege of Temesvár (1552)
 Siege of Muscat (1552)
 Siege of Metz (1552–53) – Italian War of 1551–1559
 Siege of Kazan (1552) – Part of the Russo-Kazan wars
 Siege of Hormuz (1552–54)
 Siege of Eger (1552) – Part of Ottoman–Habsburg wars
 Siege of Katsurao (1553)
 Siege of Iwatsurugi Castle (1554)

 Siege of Kiso Fukushima (1554)
 Siege of Kannomine (1554)
 Siege of Matsuo (1554)
 Siege of Siena (1554–55) – Italian War of 1551–1559
 Siege of Oran (1556)
 Siege of Katsurayama (1557)
 Siege of Kotte (1557–58) – Sinhalese–Portuguese War
 Siege of Calais (1558) – Italian War of 1551–1559
 Siege of Narva (1558) – Livonian War
 Siege of Thionville (1558) – Italian War of 1551–1559
 Siege of Bahrain (1559)
 Siege of Dorpat (1558) – Livonian War
 Siege of Weissenstein (1558) - Livonian War
 Siege of Dorpat (1559) - Livonian War
 Siege of Lais (1559) - Livonian War
 Siege of Fellin (1560) – Livonian War
 Siege of Weissenstein (1560) – Livonian War
 Siege of Leith (1560)
 Siege of Marune (1560)
 Siege of Moji (1561)
 Siege of Odawara (1561)
 Siege of Kaminogō Castle (1562)
 Siege of Inverness (1562)
 Siege of Rouen (1562) – French Wars of Religion
 Siege of Weissenstein (1562) - Livonian War
 Siege of Musashi-Matsuyama (1563)
 Siege of Orleans (1563) – French Wars of Religion

 Sieges of Oran and Mers El Kébir (1563)
 Capture of Älvsborg – Northern Seven Years' War
 Siege of Concepción (1564)
 Siege of Chauragarh (1564)
 Siege of Kuragano (1565)
 Great Siege of Malta (1565)
 Siege of Minowa (1566)
 Siege of Szigetvár (1566) – Ottoman siege during which Suleiman the Magnificent died
 Siege of Valenciennes (1566–67) – Eighty Years' War
 Siege of Inabayama Castle (1567)
 Siege of Chittorgarh (1567–68)
 Siege of Ranthambore (1568)
 Siege of Chartres (1568)
 Siege of Malacca (1568)
 Siege of Hachigata (1568)
 Siege of Odawara (1569)
 Siege of Kanbara (1569)
 Siege of Kakegawa (1569)
 Siege of Tachibana (1569)
 Siege of Varberg (1569) – Northern Seven Years' War
 Siege of Ogucji Castle (1569)
 Siege of Hanazawa (1570)
 Siege of Chōkō-ji (1570)
 Siege of Kanegasaki (1570)
 Siege of Nicosia, Cyprus (1570) – Fourth Ottoman–Venetian War
 Siege of Famagusta, Cyprus (1570–71) – Fourth Ottoman–Venetian War
 Siege of Reval (1570–71) – Livonian War
 Siege of Weissenstein (1570–71) - Livonian War
 Siege of Ishiyama Honganji (1570–1580) – longest siege in Japanese history
Siege of Chale (1571) - War of the league of Indies
 Siege of Fukazawa (1571)
 Siege of Moscow (1571) – Part of Russo-Crimean Wars
 Sieges of Nagashima (1571, 1573, 1574)
 Siege of Mount Hiei (1571)
 Siege of Futamata (1572)
 Siege of Iwamura Castle (1572)
 Siege of Mons (1572) – Eighty Years' War
 Siege of Middelburg (1572–74) – Eighty Years' War
 Siege of La Rochelle (1572–1573), assault on the Huguenot city of La Rochelle during the French Wars of Religion.
 Siege of Sancerre (1572–1573) – French Wars of Religion
 Siege of Haarlem (1572–1573) – conducted by the Spanish against the Dutch during the Eighty Years' War
 Siege of Weissenstein (1572–73) - Livonian War
 Siege of Noda Castle (1573)
 Siege of Odani Castle (1573)
 Siege of Hikida Castle (1573)
 Siege of Ichijōdani Castle (1573)
 Siege of Alkmaar (1573) – turning point in the Eighty Years' War
 Siege of Leiden (1573–1574) – Eighty Years' War
 Siege of Wesenberg (1574) – Livonian War
 Siege of Itami (1574)
 Siege of Takatenjin (1574)
 Siege of Tunis (1574)
 Siege of Limahong (1574)
 Siege of Yoshida Castle (1575)
 Siege of Nagashino (1575)
 Siege of Schoonhoven (1575) – Eighty Years' War
 Siege of Zierikzee (1575–1576)) – Eighty Years' War
 Siege of Mitsuji (1576)
 Siege of Takabaru (1576)
 Siege of Antwerp (1576) – during the Eighty Years' War
 Siege of Nanao (1577)
 Siege of Shigisan (1577)
 Siege of Reval (1577) – Livonian War

 Siege of Danzig (1577) – Danzig rebellion
 Siege of Gvozdansko (1577–1578)
 Siege of Kōzuki Castle (1578)
 Siege of Otate (1578)
 Siege of Deventer (1578) – Eighty Years' War
 Siege of Miki (1578–1580)
 Siege of Itami (1579)
 Siege of Maastricht (1579) – Eighty Years' War
 Siege of Polotsk (1579) – Livonian War
 Siege of Velikiye Luki – Livonian War
 Siege of Carrigafoyle Castle (1580) – Second Desmond Rebellion
 Siege of Steenwijk (1580–1581) – Eighty Years' War
 Siege of Smerwick (1580) – Second Desmond Rebellion
 Siege of Takatenjin (1580–1581)
 Siege of Hijiyama (1581)
 Siege of Tottori (1581)
 Siege of Minamata Castle (1581)
 Siege of Narva (1581) – Livonian War
 Siege of Weissenstein (1581) - Livonian War
 Siege of Pskov (1581–1582) – Livonian War
 Siege of Niezijl (1581) – Eighty Years' War
 
 Siege of Takamatsu (1582)
 Siege of Takatō (1582)
 Siege of Uozu (1582)
 Siege of Lochem (1582) – Eighty Years' War
 Siege of Lier (1582) – Eighty Years' War
 Siege of Eindhoven (1583) – Eighty Years' War
 Siege of Godesberg (1583)
 Siege of Kaganoi (1584)
 Siege of Takehana (1584)
 Siege of Kanie (1584)
 Siege of Suemori (1584)
 Siege of Ypres (1584) – Eighty Years' War
 Siege of Ghent (1584) – Eighty Years' War
 Siege of Antwerp (1584–1585) – Eighty Years' War
 Siege of Bruges (1584) – Eighty Years' War
 Siege of Brussels (1584–85) – Eighty Years' War
 Siege of Toyama (1585)
 Siege of Negoro-ji (1585)
 Siege of Ōta Castle (1585)
 Siege of IJsseloord (1585) – Eighty Years' War
 Siege of Iwaya Castle (1586)
 Siege of Cartagena de Indias (1586) during the Anglo–Spanish War
 Siege of Grave (1586) – Eighty Years' War
 Siege of Venlo (1586) – Eighty Years' War
 Siege of Axel (1586) – Eighty Years' War
 Second siege of Neuss (July 1586)
 Siege of Rheinberg (1586–1590) – Eighty Years' War
 Siege of Ganjaku (1587)
 Siege of Akizuki (1587)
 Siege of Kagoshima (1587)
 Siege of Sluis (1587) – Eighty Years' War
 Siege of Johor (1587)
 Siege of Kraków (1587) – War of the Polish Succession (1587–88)
 Siege of Bergen op Zoom (1588) – Eighty Years' War
 Siege of Kurokawa Castle (1589)
 Siege of Hachigata (1590)
 Siege of Paris (1590) – French Wars of Religion
 Siege of Odawara Castle (1590)
 Siege of Shimoda (1590)
 Siege of Oshi (1590)
 Siege of Zutphen (1591) – Eighty Years' War
 Siege of Deventer (1591) – Eighty Years' War
 Siege of Knodsenburg (1591) – Eighty Years' War
 Siege of Hulst (1591) – Eighty Years' War
 Siege of Nijmegen (1591) – Eighty Years' War
 Siege of Rouen (1591–1592) – French Wars of Religion
 Siege of Caudebec (1592) – French Wars of Religion
 Siege of Busanjin (1592) – Japanese invasions of Korea (1592–98)
 Siege of Dongrae (1592) – Japanese invasions of Korea (1592–98)
 Siege of Steenwijk (1592) – Eighty Years' War
 Siege of Bihać (1592) – Eighty Years' War
 Siege of Pyongyang (1592) – Japanese invasions of Korea (1592–98)
 Siege of Coevorden (1592) – Eighty Years' War
 Siege of Jinju (1592) – Japanese invasions of Korea (1592–98)
 Siege of Pyongyang (1593) – Japanese invasions of Korea (1592–98)
 Siege of Haengju (1593) – Japanese invasions of Korea (1592–98)
 Siege of Geertruidenberg (1593) – Eighty Years' War
 Siege of Sisak (1593) – Long Turkish War
 Siege of Jinju (1593) – Japanese invasions of Korea (1592–98)
 Siege of Coevorden (1593–1594) – Eighty Years' War
 Siege of Groningen (1594) – Eighty Years' War
 Siege of Enniskillen (1594) – Tyrone's Rebellion
 Siege of Morlaix (1594) – French Wars of Religion
 Siege of Fort Crozon (1594) – Anglo-Spanish War (1585–1604)
 Siege of Huy (1595) – Eighty Years' War
 Siege of Caracas (1595) during the Anglo–Spanish War

 Siege of Le Catelet (1595) – French Wars of Religion
 Siege of Groenlo (1595) – Eighty Years' War
 Siege of Doullens – French Wars of Religion
 Siege of San Juan (1595) during the Anglo–Spanish War
 Siege of Calais (1596) – French Wars of Religion
 Siege of Hulst (1596) – Eighty Years' War
 Siege of Eger (1596) – Long Turkish War
 Siege of Amiens (1597) – French Wars of Religion
 Siege of Rheinberg (1597) – Eighty Years' War
 Siege of Meurs (1597) – Eighty Years' War
 Siege of Groenlo (1597) – during the Eighty Years' War
 Siege of Namwon (1597) – Japanese invasions of Korea (1592–98)
 Siege of Bredevoort (1597) – Eighty Years' War

 Siege of Enschede (1597) – Eighty Years' War
 Siege of Ootmarsum (1597) – Eighty Years' War
 Siege of Oldenzaal (1597) – Eighty Years' War
 Siege of Lingen (1597) – Eighty Years' War
Siege of Buda (1598)
 Siege of Ulsan (1598) – Japanese invasions of Korea (1592–98)
 Second siege of Ulsan (1598) – Japanese invasions of Korea (1592–98)
 Siege of Suncheon (1598) – Japanese invasions of Korea (1592–98)
 Siege of Sacheon (1598) – Japanese invasions of Korea (1592–98)
 Siege of Schenckenschans (1599) – Eighty Years' War

 Siege of Zaltbommel (1599) – Eighty Years' War
 Siege of Cahir Castle (1599) – Nine Years' War (Ireland)
 Siege of Rees (1599) – Eighty Years' War

17th century
 Siege of San Andreas (1600) – Eighty Years' War
 Siege of Ueda (1600)
 Siege of Fushimi (1600)
 Siege of Ōtsu (1600)
 Siege of Shiroishi (1600)
 Siege of Hataya (1600)
 Siege of Kaminoyama (1600)
 Siege of Hasedō (1600)

 Siege of Tanabe (1600)
 Siege of Udo (1600)
 Siege of Yanagawa (1600)
 Siege of Pernau (1600) – Polish–Swedish War (1600–11)
 Siege of Fellin (1600) – Polish–Swedish War (1600–11)
 Siege of Dorpat (1600) – Polish–Swedish War (1600–11)
 Siege of Rheinberg (1601) – Eighty Years' War
 Siege of Ostend (1601–04) – Eighty Years' War
 Siege of Nagykanizsa (1601) – Long Turkish War
 Siege of Donegal (1601) – Nine Years' War (Ireland)
 Siege of Kinsale (1601–02) – Nine Years' War (Ireland)
 Siege of Wolmar (1601) – Polish–Swedish War (1600–11)
 Siege of 's-Hertogenbosch (1601) – Eighty Years' War
 Siege of Fellin (1602) – Polish–Swedish War (1600–11)
 Siege of Weissenstein (1602) – Polish–Swedish War (1600–11)
 Siege of Dunboy (1602) – Nine Years' War (Ireland)
 Siege of Grave (1602) – Eighty Years' War
 Siege of Buda (1602–1603) – Long Turkish War
 Siege of Sluis (1604) – Eighty Years' War
 Siege of Weissenstein (1604) – Polish–Swedish War (1600–11)
 Siege of Kromy (1605) – Polish–Muscovite War (1605–18)
 Siege of Lingen (1605) – Eighty Years' War
 Siege of Kandahar (1605–06)

 Siege of Malacca (1606) – Dutch-Portuguese War
 Siege of Ganja (1606) – Ottoman–Safavid War (1603–18)
 Siege of Groenlo (1606) – Eighty Years' War
 Siege of Tory Island (1608) – O'Doherty's rebellion
 Siege of Troitse-Sergiyeva Lavra (1608–10) – Polish–Muscovite War (1605–1618)
 Siege of Fellin (1600) – Polish–Swedish War (1600–11)
 Siege of Weissenstein (1608) – Polish–Swedish War (1600–11)
 Siege of Pärnu (1609) – Polish–Swedish War (1600–11)
 Siege of Smolensk (1609–11) – Polish–Muscovite War (1605–1618)
 Siege of Kalmar (1611) – Kalmar War
 Storming of Kristianopel (1611) – Kalmar War
 Siege of Moscow (1612) – Polish–Muscovite War (1605–1618)
 Siege of Smolensk (1613–17) – Polish–Muscovite War (1605–1618)

 Siege of Tikhvin (1613) – Ingrian War
 Siege of Gdov (1614) – Ingrian War
 Siege of Aachen (1614) – Eighty Years' War
 Siege of Osaka (1614–15)
 Siege of Pskov (1615) – Ingrian War
 Siege of Gradisca (1616) – Uskok War
 Siege of Gradisca (1617) – Uskok War
 Siege of Pilsen (1618) – Thirty Years' War
 Siege of Moscow (1618) – Polish–Muscovite War (1605–1618)
 Siege of Budweis (1619) – Thirty Years' War
 Siege of Kassa (1619) – Thirty Years' War
 Siege of Vienna (1619) – Thirty Years' War
 Siege of Bad Kreuznach (1620) – Thirty Years' War
 Siege of Neuhäusel (1621) – Thirty Years' War
 Siege of Saint-Jean-d'Angély (1621) – Huguenot rebellions
 Blockade of La Rochelle (1621–22) – Huguenot rebellions
 Siege of Montauban (1621) – Huguenot rebellions
 Siege of Pressburg (1621) – Thirty Years' War
 Siege of Riga (1621) – Polish–Swedish War (1621–25)
 Siege of Jülich (1621–22) – Eighty Years' War
 Siege of Frankenthal (1621–1623) – Thirty Years' War
 Siege of Ormuz (1622)
 Siege of Royan (1622) – Huguenot rebellions
 Siege of Nègrepelisse (1622) – Huguenot rebellions

 Siege of Montpellier (1622) – Huguenot rebellions
 Siege of Bergen-op-Zoom (1622) – Eighty Years' War
 Siege of Heidelberg (1622) – Thirty Years' War
 Capture of Mannheim (1622) – Thirty Years' War
Siege of Araya Castle (1622–1623) – Eighty Years' War
 Siege of Breda (1624–1625) – Eighty Years' War
 Siege of Gavi (1625)
 Siege of Genoa (1625)
 Recapture of Bahia (1625) – Eighty Years' War
 Siege of Verrua (1625)
 Siege of Koknese (1625) – Polish–Swedish War (1621–25)
 Siege of Dorpat (1625) – Polish–Swedish War (1621–25)
 Siege of San Juan (1625) – Eighty Years' War
 Siege of Saint-Martin-de-Ré (1625)
 Siege of Oldenzaal (1626) – Eighty Years' War

 Siege of Saint-Martin-de-Ré (1627) – Anglo-French War (1627–1629)
 Siege of Wolfenbüttel (1627) – Thirty Years' War
 Siege of Nienburg (1627) – Thirty Years' War
 Siege of Groenlo (1627) – Eighty Years' War
 Siege of La Rochelle (1627–1628) – Huguenot rebellions
 Siege of Stralsund (1628) – Thirty Years' War
 Siege of Glückstadt (1628) – Thirty Years' War
 Siege of Batavia (1628–29)
 Siege of Mantua (1629–30)
 Siege of Casale Monferrato (1629–31)
 Siege of 's-Hertogenbosch (1629) – Eighty Years' War
 Siege of Privas (1629) – Huguenot rebellions
 Siege of Alès (1629) – Huguenot rebellions
 Sack of Magdeburg (1631) – Thirty Years' War
 Siege of Maastricht (1632) – Eighty Years' War
 Siege of Nuremberg (1632) – Thirty Years' War

 Siege of Dorogobuzh (1632) – Smolensk War
 Siege of Smolensk (1632–33) – Smolensk War
 Siege of Hameln (1633) – Thirty Years' War
 Siege of Hagenau (1633) – Thirty Years' War
 Siege of Konstanz (1633) – Thirty Years' War
 Siege of Rheinfelden (1633) – Thirty Years' War
 Siege of Regensburg (1633) – Thirty Years' War
 Siege of Belaya (1634)
 Siege of Überlingen (1634) – Thirty Years' War
 Siege of Regensburg (1634) – Thirty Years' War
 Siege of Lüshun (1634)
 Siege of Hildesheim (1634) – Thirty Years' War
 Siege of Nördlingen (1634) – Thirty Years' War
 Siege of Minden (1634) – Thirty Years' War
 Siege of Heidelberg (1634) – Thirty Years' War
 Siege of Leuven (1635) – Eighty Years' War
 Siege of Schenkenschans (1635–1636) – Eighty Years' War
 Siege of Mainz (1635) – Thirty Years' War
 Siege of Dôle (1636) – Franco-Spanish War (1635–59)
 Siege of La Capelle (1636) – Franco-Spanish War (1635–59)
 Siege of Le Câtelet (1636) – Franco-Spanish War (1635–59)
 Siege of Magdeburg (1636) – Thirty Years' War
 Siege of Corbie (1636) – Franco-Spanish War (1635–59)
 Siege of Leipzig (1637) – Thirty Years' War
 Siege of Breda (1637) – Eighty Years' War
 Siege of Landrecies (1637) – Franco-Spanish War (1635–59)
 Siege of Venlo (1637) – Eighty Years' War
 Siege of Leucate (1637) – Franco-Spanish War (1635–59)
 Siege of Hara Castle (1637–1638)
 Siege of Azov (1637–1642) – Part of Russo-Turkish Wars
 Siege of Saint-Omer (1638) – Franco-Spanish War (1635–59)
 Siege of Fuenterrabía (1638) – Franco-Spanish War (1635–59)
 Battle of Breisach (1638) – Thirty Years' War
 Siege of Lemgo (1638) – Thirty Years' War
 Siege of Baghdad (1638) by Ottomans
 Siege of Hesdin (1639) – Franco-Spanish War (1635–59)
 Relief of Thionville (1639) – Franco-Spanish War (1635–59)
 Siege of Salses (1639–1640) – Franco-Spanish War (1635–59)
 Siege of Casale (1640) – Franco-Spanish War (1635–59)
 Siege of Galle (1640) – Dutch-Portuguese War
 Siege of Turin (1640) – Franco-Spanish War (1635–59)
 Siege of Arras (1640) – Franco-Spanish War (1635–59)
 Siege of Neunburg (1641) – Thirty Years' War
 Siege of Wolfenbüttel (1641) – Thirty Years' War
 Siege of São Filipe (1641–1642) – Portuguese Restoration War
 Siege of Dorsten (1641) – Thirty Years' War
 Siege of Göttingen (1641) – Thirty Years' War
 Siege of Perpignan (1641–1642) – Franco-Spanish War (1635–59)
 Siege of Glogau (1642) – Thirty Years' War
 Siege of Olmütz (1642) – Thirty Years' War
 Siege of Brieg (1642) – Thirty Years' War
 Siege of Leipzig (1642) – Thirty Years' War
 Siege of Hull (1642) – First English Civil War
 Siege of Portsmouth (1642) – First English Civil War
 Second siege of Glogau (1642) – Thirty Years' War
 Sieges of Bradford (1642–1643) – First English Civil War
 Siege of Reading (1642–1643) – First English Civil War
 Siege of Chichester (1642) – First English Civil War
 Siege of Rocroi (1643) – Franco-Spanish War (1635–59)
 Siege of Thionville (1643) – Franco-Spanish War (1635–59)
 Siege of Worcester (1643) – First English Civil War
 Siege of Lichfield (1643) – First English Civil War
 Siege of Gloucester (1643) – First English Civil War
 Siege of Sierck (1643) – Franco-Spanish War (1635–59)
 Siege of Hull (1643) – First English Civil War
 Siege of Newcastle (1644) – First English Civil War
 Siege of Lathom House (1644) – First English Civil War
 Siege of Überlingen (1644) – Thirty Years' War
 Siege of Lyme Regis (1644) – First English Civil War
 Siege of York (1644) – First English Civil War
 Siege of Lincoln (1644) – First English Civil War
 Siege of Lleida (1644) – Franco-Spanish War (1635–59)
Siege of Gravelines (1644) – Franco-Spanish War (1635–59)
 Siege of Oxford (1644–1646) – First English Civil War
 Siege of Sas van Gent (1644) – Eighty Years' War
 Siege of Philippsburg (1644) – Thirty Years' War
 Siege of Montgomery Castle (1644) – First English Civil War
 Sieges of Taunton (1644–1645) – First English Civil War
 Siege of Duncannon (1645) – Irish Confederate Wars
 Siege of Chester (1645) – First English Civil War
 Great Siege of Scarborough Castle (1645) – First English Civil War
 Siege of Carlisle (1644) – First English Civil War
 Siege of Brünn (1645) – Thirty Years' War
 Siege of Mardyck (1645) – Franco-Spanish War (1635–59)
 Siege of Bristol (1645) – First English Civil War
 Siege of Béthune (1645) – Franco-Spanish War (1635–59)
 Siege of Lillers (1645) – Franco-Spanish War (1635–59)
 Siege of Saint-Venant (1645) – Franco-Spanish War (1635–59)
 Siege of Hulst (1645) – Eighty Years' War
 Siege of Worcester (1646) – First English Civil War
 Siege of Mardyck (1646) – Thirty Years' War
 Siege of Dunkirk (1646) – Franco-Spanish War (1635–59)
 Siege of Augsburg (1646) – Thirty Years' War
 Siege of Lindau (1647) – Thirty Years' War
 Siege of Armentières (1647) – Franco-Spanish War (1635–59)
 Siege of Landrecies (1647) – Franco-Spanish War (1635–59)
 Siege of Ypres (1647) – Franco-Spanish War (1635–59)
 Siege of Memmingen (1647) – Thirty Years' War
 Siege of Candia (Crete) (1648–69) – claimed as the second-longest siege in history
 Siege of Pembroke (1648) – Second English Civil War
 Siege of Colchester (1648) – Second English Civil War
 Siege of Prague (1648) – Thirty Years' War
 Siege of Inverness (1649)
 Siege of Zbarazh (1649) – Khmelnytsky uprising
 Siege of Dublin (1649)
 Siege of Drogheda (1649) – Cromwellian conquest of Ireland
 Siege of Wexford (1649) – Cromwellian conquest of Ireland
 Siege of Waterford (1649–1650) – Cromwellian conquest of Ireland
 Siege of Inverness (1650)
 Siege of Kilkenny (1650) – Cromwellian conquest of Ireland
 Siege of Clonmel (1650) – Irish Confederate Wars
 Siege of Charlemont (1650) – Irish Confederate Wars
 Cromwell's Siege of Limerick City, Ireland (1651) – Irish Confederate Wars
 Siege of Barcelona (1651–1652), during the Catalan Revolt
 Siege of Galway (1651–1652) – Irish Confederate Wars

 Siege of Arras (1654) – Franco-Spanish War (1635–59)
 Siege of Smolensk (1654) – Russo-Polish War (1654–67)
 Siege of Landrecies (1655) – Franco-Spanish War (1635–59)
 Siege of Santo Domingo (1655) – Anglo-Spanish War (1654–60)
 Siege of Kraków (1655) – Second Northern War
 Siege of Danzig (1655–60) – Second Northern War
 Siege of Jasna Góra (1655) – during The Deluge
 Siege of Valenciennes (1656) – Franco-Spanish War (1635–59)
 Siege of Zamość (1656) – Second Northern War
 Siege of Warsaw (1656) – Second Northern War
 Siege of Nöteborg (1656) – Russo-Swedish War (1656–58)
 Siege of Nyenschantz (1656) – Russo-Swedish War (1656–58)
 Siege of Dyneburg (1656) – Russo-Swedish War (1656–58)
 Siege of Riga (1656) – Russo-Swedish War (1656–58)
 Siege of Dorpat (1656) – Russo-Swedish War (1656–58)

 Siege of Bidar (1657)
 Siege of Kraków (1657) – Second Northern War
 Siege of Dorpat (1657) – Russo-Swedish War (1656–58)
 Siege of Dunkirk (1658) – Franco-Spanish War (1635–59)
 Siege of Toruń (1658) – Second Northern War
 Siege of Badajoz (1658) – Portuguese Restoration War
 Siege of Copenhagen (1658–1659) Second Northern War, Swedes defeated by Danish and Dutch defenders
 Siege of Kolding (1658) – Second Northern War
 Siege of Lyakhavichy (1660) – Russo-Polish War (1654–67)
 Siege of Fort Zeelandia (1661–1662) – Sino-Dutch conflicts
 Siege of Érsekújvár (1663) – Austro-Turkish War (1663–1664)
 Siege of Hlukhiv (1664) – Russo-Polish War (1654–67)
 Siege of Valência de Alcântara (1664)
 Siege of Novi Zrin Castle (1664) in northern Croatia – Austro-Turkish War (1663–64)
 Siege of Léva (1664) – Austro-Turkish War (1663–1664)
 Siege of Purandhar (1665)
 Siege of Charleroi (1667) – War of Devolution
 Siege of Tournai (1667) – War of Devolution
 Siege of Douai (1667) – War of Devolution
 Siege of Lille (1667) – War of Devolution
 Siege of Dole (1668) – War of Devolution
 Siege of Solovetsky Monastery (1668–76) – eight years
 Siege of Groenlo (1672) – Franco-Dutch War
 Siege of Groningen (1672) – Franco-Dutch War
 Siege of Kamenets (1672) – Polish–Ottoman War (1672–76)

 Siege of Maastricht (1673) – Franco-Dutch War
 Siege of Bonn (1673) – Franco-Dutch War
 Siege of Besançon (1674) – Franco-Dutch War
 Siege of Ponda (1675)
 Siege of Maastricht (1676) – Franco-Dutch War
 Siege of Philippsburg (1676) – Franco-Dutch War
 Siege of Valenciennes (1676–77) – Franco-Dutch War
 Siege of Freiburg (1677) – Franco-Dutch War
 Siege of Cambrai (1677) – Franco-Dutch War
 Siege of Malmö (1677) – Scanian War
 Siege of Ghent (1678) – Franco-Dutch War
 Siege of Ypres (1678) – Franco-Dutch War
 Siege of Puigcerdà (1678) – Franco-Dutch War
 Siege of Stralsund (1678) – Scanian War
 Siege of Vienna (1683) – siege of Vienna during the Great Turkish War
 Siege of Luxembourg (1684) – War of the Reunions
 Siege of Genoa (1684) – War of the Reunions
 Siege of Buda (1684), Austrian army tried to take Buda from Ottoman Turkey
 Siege of Santa Maura (1684) – Morean War
 Siege of Sinj (1684) – Morean War
 Siege of Sinj (1685) – Morean War
 Siege of Bijapur (1685–86)
 Siege of Cojor (1685) – Morean War

 Siege of Érsekújvár (1685) – Great Turkish War
 Siege of Kelefa (1686) – Morean War
 Siege of Navarino (1686) – Morean War
 Siege of Buda (1686) – Great Turkish War
 Siege of Modon (1686) – Morean War
 Siege of Nauplia (1686) – Morean War
 Siege of Pécs (1686) – Great Turkish War
 Siege of Golconda (1687)
 Siege of Castelnuovo (1687) – Morean War

 Siege of Monemvasia (1687–1690) – Morean War
 Siege of the Acropolis (1687) – Morean War
 Siege of Bangkok (1688) – Siamese revolution of 1688
 Siege of Negroponte (1688) – Great Turkish War
 Siege of Belgrade (1688) – Great Turkish War
 Siege of Knin (1688) – Morean War
 Siege of Philippsburg (1688) – Nine Years' War
 Siege of Mannheim (1688) – Nine Years' War
 Siege of Frankenthal (1688) – Nine Years' War
 Siege of Derry (1689) – Williamite War in Ireland
 Siege of Kaiserswerth (1689) – Nine Years' War
 Siege of Mainz (1689) – Nine Years' War
 Siege of Larache (1689)
 Siege of Pemaquid (1689) – Nine Years' War
 Siege of Carrickfergus (1689) – Williamite War in Ireland
 Siege of Bonn (1689) – Nine Years' War
 Siege of Gingee (1689–1698)
 First siege of Athlone (1690), Williamite War in Ireland
 Siege of Kanina (1690) – Morean War
 Siege of Niš (1690) – Great Turkish War

 Siege of Cork (1690) – Williamite War in Ireland
 Siege of Belgrade (1690) – Great Turkish War
 Siege of Québec City (1690) – First siege of Québec City
 Siege of Jinji (1690–1698)
 Siege of Limerick (1691), Williamite War in Ireland
 Second siege of Athlone (1691), Williamite War in Ireland
 Siege of Mons (1691) – Nine Years' War
 Siege of Cuneo (1691) – Nine Years' War
 Siege of Candia (1692) – Morean War
 Siege of Namur (1692) – Nine Years' War
 Siege of Embrun (1692) – Nine Years' War
 Siege of Ebernburg (1692) – Nine Years' War
 Siege of Belgrade (1693) – Great Turkish War
 Siege of Huy (1693) – Nine Years' War
 Siege of Charleroi (1693) – Nine Years' War
 Siege of Pinerolo (1693) – Nine Years' War
 Siege of Chios (1694) – Morean War
 Siege of Palamos (1694) – Nine Years' War
 Siege of Gerona (1694) – Nine Years' War
 Siege of Huy (1694) – Nine Years' War

 Siege of Ceuta (1694–1727) – claimed as the longest siege in history
 Siege of Casale (1695) – Nine Years' War
 Siege of Namur (1695) – Nine Years' War
 Capitulation of Diksmuide (1695) – Nine Years' War
 Siege of Fort Jesus (1696–1698)
 Siege of Pemaquid (1696) – Nine Years' War
 Siege of Fort Nashwaak (1696) – Nine Years' War
 Siege of Ath (1697) – Nine Years' War
 Siege of Barcelona (1697) – Nine Years' War
 Siege of Ebernburg (1697) – Nine Years' War
 Siege of Cartagena de Indias (1697)

18th century
 Siege of Riga (1700) – Great Northern War

 Siege of Tönning (1700) – Great Northern War
 Siege of Riga (1700) – Great Northern War
 Siege of Narva (1700) – Great Northern War
 Siege of Kaiserswerth (1702) – War of the Spanish Succession
 Siege of Saint Donas (1702) – War of the Spanish Succession
 Siege of Castiglione (1702) – War of the Spanish Succession
 Siege of Landau (1702) – War of the Spanish Succession
 Siege of Borgoforte (1702) – War of the Spanish Succession
 Siege of Guastalla (1702) – War of the Spanish Succession
 Siege of Venlo (1702) – War of the Spanish Succession
 Siege of Stevensweert (1702) – War of the Spanish Succession
 Siege of Roermond (1702) – War of the Spanish Succession
 Siege of Nöteborg (1702) – Great Northern War
 Siege of Liége (1702) – War of the Spanish Succession
 Siege of Rheinberg (1702) – War of the Spanish Succession
 Siege of Hulst (1702) – War of the Spanish Succession
 Siege of Trarbach (1702) – War of the Spanish Succession
 Siege of St. Augustine (1702) – War of the Spanish Succession
 Siege of Andernach (1702) – War of the Spanish Succession
 Siege of Governolo (1702) – War of the Spanish Succession

 Siege of Neubourg (1703) – War of the Spanish Succession
 Siege of Kehl (1703) – War of the Spanish Succession
 Siege of Bonn (1703) – War of the Spanish Succession
 Siege of Thorn (1703) – Great Northern War
 Siege of Nago (1703) – War of the Spanish Succession
 Siege of Arco (1703) – War of the Spanish Succession
 Siege of Breisach (1703) – War of the Spanish Succession
 Siege of Huy (1703) – War of the Spanish Succession
 Siege of Limburg (1703) – War of the Spanish Succession
 Siege of Landau (1703) – War of the Spanish Succession
 Siege of Augsburg (1703) – War of the Spanish Succession
 Siege of Guadeloupe (1703) – War of the Spanish Succession
 Siege of Castello de Vide (1704) – War of the Spanish Succession
 Siege of Wagingera (1704)
 Siege of Barcelona (1704) – War of the Spanish Succession
 Siege of Susa (1704) – War of the Spanish Succession
 Siege of Portalegre (1704) – War of the Spanish Succession
 Siege of Vercelli (1704) – War of the Spanish Succession

 Siege of Rain (1704) – War of the Spanish Succession
 Siege of Narva (1704) – Great Northern War
 Siege of Dorpat (1704) – Great Northern War
 Siege of Villingen (1704) – War of the Spanish Succession
 Siege of Susa (1704) – War of the Spanish Succession
 Siege of Fort Isabella (1704) – War of the Spanish Succession
 Siege of Gibraltar (1704) – eleventh siege of Gibraltar, by Sir George Rooke's Anglo-Dutch fleet
 Siege of Ulm (1704) – War of the Spanish Succession
 Twelfth Siege of Gibraltar (1704–05) – War of the Spanish Succession
 Siege of Ivree (1704) – War of the Spanish Succession
 Siege of Landau (1704) – War of the Spanish Succession
 Siege of Verrua (1704) – War of the Spanish Succession
 Siege of Trarbach (1704) – War of the Spanish Succession
 Siege of Colonia del Sacramento (1704–1705) – War of the Spanish Succession
 Siege of St. John's (1705) – War of the Spanish Succession
 Siege of Valencia de Alcantara (1705) – War of the Spanish Succession
 Siege of Albuquerque (1705) – War of the Spanish Succession
 Siege of Huy (1705) – War of the Spanish Succession
 Siege of Liège (1705) – War of the Spanish Succession
 Second siege of Huy (1705) – War of the Spanish Succession
 Siege of Chivasso (1705) – War of the Spanish Succession
 Siege of Mirandola (1705) – War of the Spanish Succession
 Siege of Nice (1705–06) – War of the Spanish Succession
 Siege of Zoutleeuw (1705) – War of the Spanish Succession
 Siege of Barcelona (1705) – War of the Spanish Succession
 Siege of Hagenau (1705) – War of the Spanish Succession
 Siege of Badajoz (1705) – War of the Spanish Succession
 Siege of Zandvliet (1705) – War of the Spanish Succession
 Siege of Diest (1705) – War of the Spanish Succession

 Siege of San Mateo (1705) – War of the Spanish Succession
 Siege of Alcantara (1706) – War of the Spanish Succession
 Siege of Barcelona (1706) – War of the Spanish Succession
 Siege of Hagenau (1706) – War of the Spanish Succession
 Siege of Ciudad Rodrigo (1706) – War of the Spanish Succession
 Siege of Turin (1706) – War of the Spanish Succession
 Siege of Oostende (1706) – War of the Spanish Succession
 Siege of Menin (1706) – War of the Spanish Succession
 Siege of Alicante (1706) – War of the Spanish Succession
 Siege of Dendermonde (1706) – War of the Spanish Succession
 Siege of Ath (1706) – War of the Spanish Succession
 Siege of Pavia (1706) – War of the Spanish Succession
 Siege of Cuenca (1706) – War of the Spanish Succession
 Siege of Pizzigetone (1706) – War of the Spanish Succession
 Siege of Elche (1706) – War of the Spanish Succession
 Siege of Cartagena (1706) – War of the Spanish Succession
 Siege of Casale (1706) – War of the Spanish Succession
 Siege of Milan (1707) – War of the Spanish Succession
 Siege of Villena (1707) – War of the Spanish Succession
 Siege of Xàtiva (1707) – War of the Spanish Succession
 Siege of Port Royal (1707) – War of the Spanish Succession
 Siege of Toulon (1707) – War of the Spanish Succession
 Siege of Gaeta (1707) – War of the Spanish Succession
 Siege of Pensacola (1707) – War of the Spanish Succession
 Siege of Ciudad Rodrigo (1707) – War of the Spanish Succession

 Siege of Susa (1707) – War of the Spanish Succession
 Siege of Lérida (1707) – War of the Spanish Succession
 Siege of Morella (1707) – War of the Spanish Succession
 Siege of Oran (1707–1708) – Conflicts between Spain and Algiers
 Siege of Tortosa (1708) – War of the Spanish Succession
 Siege of Exilles (1708) – War of the Spanish Succession
 Siege of Lille (1708) – War of the Spanish Succession
 Siege of Fenestrelles (1708) – War of the Spanish Succession
 Siege of San Felipe (1708) – War of the Spanish Succession
 Siege of Leffinghe (1708) – War of the Spanish Succession
 Siege of Denia (1708) – War of the Spanish Succession
 Siege of Saint Ghislain (1708) – War of the Spanish Succession
 Siege of Brussels (1708) – War of the Spanish Succession
 Siege of Alicante (1708–09) – War of the Spanish Succession
 Siege of Ghent (1708) – War of the Spanish Succession
 Siege of Veprik (1709) – Great Northern War
 Siege of Tournai (1709) – War of the Spanish Succession
 Siege of Mons (1709) – War of the Spanish Succession
 Siege of Viborg (1710) – Great Northern War
 Siege of Reval (1710) – Great Northern War
 Siege of Douai (1710) – War of the Spanish Succession
 Siege of Béthune (1710) – War of the Spanish Succession
 Siege of Aire (1710) – War of the Spanish Succession
 Siege of Saint Venant (1710) – War of the Spanish Succession
 Siege of Port Royal (1710) – War of the Spanish Succession
 Siege of Gerona (1710–1711) – War of the Spanish Succession
 Siege of Kassa (1711) – Rákóczi's War of Independence
 Siege of Aren fort (1711) – War of the Spanish Succession
 Siege of Bouchain (1711) – War of the Spanish Succession
 Siege of Venasque (1711) – War of the Spanish Succession
 Siege of Stralsund (1711–15) – Great Northern War
 Siege of Castel-Leon (1711) – War of the Spanish Succession
 Siege of Cardona (1711) – War of the Spanish Succession
 Siege of Le Quesnoy (1712) – War of the Spanish Succession
 Siege of Landrecies (1712) – War of the Spanish Succession
 Siege of Marchiennes (1712) – War of the Spanish Succession
 Siege of Douai (1712) – War of the Spanish Succession

 Second siege of Le Quesnoy (1712) – War of the Spanish Succession
 Siege of Bouchain (1712) – War of the Spanish Succession
 Siege of Gerona (1712–1713) – War of the Spanish Succession
 Siege of Tönning (1713–1714) – Great Northern War
 Siege of Landau (1713) – War of the Spanish Succession
 Siege of Barcelona (1713–14) – War of the Spanish Succession
 Siege of Freiburg (1713) – War of the Spanish Succession
 Siege of Gurdaspur (1715)
 Siege of Brahan (1715) – Jacobite rising of 1715
 Siege of Inverness (1715) – Jacobite rising of 1715

 Siege of Temeşvar (1716) – Austro-Turkish War (1716–1718)
 Siege of Belgrade (1717) – Austro-Turkish War (1716–1718)
 Siege of Fredriksten (1718) – Great Northern War
 Siege of Isfahan (1722)
 Thirteenth Siege of Gibraltar (1727) – by a Spanish army
 Siege of Oran (1732) – Conflicts between Spain and Algiers
 Siege of Kehl (1733) – War of the Polish Succession
 Siege of Pizzighettone (1733) – War of the Polish Succession
 Siege of Danzig (1734) – War of the Polish Succession
 Siege of Gaeta (1734) – War of the Polish Succession
 Siege of Trarbach (1734) – War of the Polish Succession
 Siege of Capua (1734) – War of the Polish Succession
 Siege of Philippsburg (1734) – War of the Polish Succession
 Siege of Messina (1734–1735) – War of the Polish Succession
 Siege of Ganja (1734–1735) – Ottoman–Persian War (1730–35)
 Siege of Syracuse (1735) – War of the Polish Succession
 Siege of Trapani (1735) – War of the Polish Succession
 Siege of Colonia del Sacramento (1735–1737) – Spanish–Portuguese War (1735–1737)
 Siege of Perekop (1736) – Russo-Turkish War (1735–1739)
 Siege of Azov (1736) – Russo-Turkish War (1735–1739)
 Siege of Banja Luka (1737) – Austro-Turkish War (1737–1739)
 Siege of Ochakov (1737) – Russo-Turkish War (1735–1739)
 Siege of Kandahar (1737–1738) 
 Siege of Mehadia (1738) – Austro-Turkish War (1737–1739)
 Siege of Orsova (1738) – Austro-Turkish War (1737–1739)

 Siege of Belgrade (1739) – Austro-Turkish War (1737–1739)
 Siege of Portobello (1739) – victory of British siege by Edward Vernon in the War of Jenkins' Ear
 Siege of St. Augustine (1740) – War of Jenkins' Ear
 Siege of Fort Mose (1740) – War of Jenkins' Ear
 Siege of Trichinopoly (1741)
 Siege of Cartagena de Indias (1741) – failed British siege by Edward Vernon in the War of Jenkins' Ear
 Siege of Brieg (1741) – War of the Austrian Succession
 Siege of Santiago (1741) – War of the Austrian Succession
 Siege of Neisse (1741)
 Siege of Glatz (1742) – War of the Austrian Succession
 Siege of Eger (1742) – War of the Austrian Succession
 Siege of Mirandola (1742) – War of the Austrian Succession
 Siege of Modena (1742) – War of the Austrian Succession
 Siege of Prague (1742) – War of the Austrian Succession
 Siege of La Guaira (1743) – War of the Austrian Succession
 Siege of Eger (1743) – War of the Austrian Succession
 Siege of Puerto Cabello (1743) – War of the Austrian Succession
 Blockade of Straubing (1743) – War of the Austrian Succession
 Siege of Trichinopoly (1743)
 Siege of Ingolstadt (1743) – War of the Austrian Succession
 Siege of Mosul (1743) – Ottoman–Persian War (1743–46)
 Siege of Menin (1744) – War of the Austrian Succession
 Siege of Ypres (1744) – War of the Austrian Succession
 Siege of Furnes (1744) – War of the Austrian Succession
 Siege of Annapolis Royal (1744) – War of the Austrian Succession (King George's War)
 Siege of Prague (1744) – War of the Austrian Succession
 Siege of Cuneo (1744) – War of the Austrian Succession
 Siege of Freiburg (1744) – War of the Austrian Succession
 Siege of Tabor (1744) – War of the Austrian Succession
 Siege of Tournai (1745) – War of the Austrian Succession
 Siege of Louisbourg (1745) – War of the Austrian Succession (King George's War)
 Siege of Port Toulouse (1745) – War of the Austrian Succession (King George's War)
 Siege of Annapolis Royal (1745) – War of the Austrian Succession (King George's War)
 Fall of Ghent (1745) – War of the Austrian Succession
 Siege of Oudenarde (1745) – War of the Austrian Succession
 Siege of Ostend (1745) – War of the Austrian Succession
 Siege of Tortona (1745) – War of the Austrian Succession
 Siege of Kosel (1745) – War of the Austrian Succession
 Siege of Ruthven Barracks (1745) – Jacobite rising of 1745
 Siege of Culloden House (1745) – Jacobite rising of 1745
 Siege of Carlisle (November 1745) – Jacobite rising of 1745
 Siege of Carlisle (December 1745) – Jacobite rising of 1745
 Siege of Fort Augustus (December 1745) – Jacobite rising of 1745
 Siege of Stirling Castle (1746) – Jacobite rising of 1745
 Siege of Brussels (1746) – War of the Austrian Succession
 Siege of Ruthven Barracks (1746) – Jacobite rising of 1745
 Siege of Inverness (1746) – Jacobite rising of 1745
 Siege of Fort Augustus (March 1746) – Jacobite rising of 1745
 Siege of Blair Castle (1745) – Jacobite rising of 1745
 Siege of Fort William (1745) – Jacobite rising of 1745
 Siege of Genoa (1746) – War of the Austrian Succession
 Siege of Mons (1746) – War of the Austrian Succession

 Siege of Namur (1746) – War of the Austrian Succession
 Siege of Madras (1746) – War of the Austrian Succession
 Siege of Genoa (1747) – War of the Austrian Succession
 Siege of Hulst (1747) – War of the Austrian Succession
 Siege of Bergen op Zoom (1747) – War of the Austrian Succession
 Siege of Maastricht (1748) – War of the Austrian Succession
 Siege of Cuddalore (1748) – War of the Austrian Succession
 Siege of Pondicherry (1748) – War of the Austrian Succession
 Siege of Arcot (1751) – Second Carnatic War
 Siege of Trichinopoly (1751–52) – Second Carnatic War
 Siege of Fort St Philip (1756) – Seven Years' War
 Siege of Pirna (1756) – Seven Years' War
 Siege of Prague (1757) – Seven Years' War
 Siege of Fort William Henry (1757) – Seven Years' War (French and Indian War)
 Siege of Schweidnitz (1757) – Seven Years' War
 Siege of Breslau (1757) – Seven Years' War

 Blockade of Liegnitz (1757) – Seven Years' War
 Blockade of Stralsund (1757–1758) – Seven Years' War
 Siege of Küstrin (1758) – Seven Years' War
 Siege of Schweidnitz (1758) – Seven Years' War
 Siege of Louisbourg (1758) – Seven Years' War (French and Indian War)
 Siege of Olmütz (1758) – by the Prussian army of Frederick the Great during the Seven Years' War
 Siege of Neisse (1758) – Seven Years' War
 Siege of Madras (1758–1759) – Seven Years' War
 Siege of Masulipatam (1759) – Seven Years' War
 Siege of Québec (1759) – Second siege of Québec, during the Seven Years' War (French and Indian War)
 Siege of Münster (1759) – Seven Years' War
 Second siege of Münster (1759) – Seven Years' War
 Siege of Fort Loudoun (1760) – Seven Years' War (French and Indian War)
 Siege of Glatz (1760) – Seven Years' War
 Siege of Dresden (1760) – Seven Years' War

 Siege of Breslau (1760) – Seven Years' War
 Siege of Wittenberg (1760) – Seven Years' War
 Siege of Pondicherry (1760–1761) – Seven Years' War
 Siege of Cassel (1761) – Seven Years' War
 Sieges of Kolberg (1759, 1760, and 1761) – Seven Years' War
 Siege of Havana (1762) – Seven Years' War. British fleet headed by George Keppel, 3rd Earl of Albemarle lays siege to Spanish controlled Havana for a month.
 Siege of Schweidnitz (1762) – Seven Years' War
 Siege of Almeida (1762) – Seven Years' War
 Siege of Cassel (1762) – Seven Years' War
 Siege of Ambur (1767) – First Anglo-Mysore War
 Siege of Khotyn (1769) – Russo-Turkish War (1768–1774)
 Siege of Bender (1770) – Russo-Turkish War (1768–1774)
 Siege of Giurgevo (1771) – Russo-Turkish War (1768–1774)
 Siege of Silistria (1773) – Russo-Turkish War (1768–1774)
 Siege of Melilla (1774), during Hispano-Moroccan wars
 Siege of Boston (1775–1776) – American Revolutionary War
 Siege of Fort St. Jean (1775) – American Revolutionary War

 Siege of Fort Ticonderoga (1777) – American Revolutionary War
 Siege of Fort Stanwix (1777) – American Revolutionary War
 Siege of Fort Henry (1777) – American Revolutionary War
 Siege of Fort Mifflin (1777) – American Revolutionary War
 Siege of Pondicherry (1778) – Anglo-French War (1778–1783)
 Siege of Fort Vincennes (1779) – American Revolutionary War
 Great Siege of Gibraltar (1779–83) – fourteenth siege of Gibraltar, by a Spanish-French army in the American Revolutionary War
 Siege of Savannah (1779) – American Revolutionary War
 Siege of Tellicherry (1779–82) – Second Anglo-Mysore War
 Siege of Charleston (1780) – American Revolutionary War
 Siege of Kastania (1780)
 Siege of Vellore (1780–82) – Second Anglo-Mysore War

 Siege of Pensacola (1781) – American Revolutionary War
 Siege of Fort Watson (1781) – American Revolutionary War
 Siege of Fort Motte (1781) – American Revolutionary War
 Siege of Augusta (1781) – American Revolutionary War
 Siege of Ninety-Six (1781) – American Revolutionary War
 Siege of Yorktown (1781) – American Revolutionary War
 Siege of Negapatam (1781) – Fourth Anglo-Dutch War
 Siege of Brimstone Hill (1782) – Anglo-French War (1778–1783)
 Siege of Fort Henry (1782) – American Revolutionary War
 Siege of Cuddalore (1783) – Second Anglo-Mysore War
 Siege of Mangalore (1783–1784) – Second Anglo-Mysore War
 Siege of Nargund (1785) – Maratha–Mysore War
 Siege of Badami (1786) – Maratha–Mysore War
 Siege of Bahadur Benda (1787) – Maratha–Mysore War
 Siege of Ochakov (1788) – Russo-Turkish War (1787–1792)
 Siege of Khotin (1788) – Austro-Turkish War (1788–1791)

 Siege of Belgrade (1789) – Austro-Turkish War (1788–1791)
 Siege of Izmail (1789–1790) – Russo-Turkish War (1787–1792)
 Siege of Oran (1790–1792) – Conflicts between Spain and Algiers
 Siege of Darwar (1790–1791) – Third Anglo-Mysore War
 Siege of Koppal (1790–1791) – Third Anglo-Mysore War
 Siege of Bangalore (1791) – Third Anglo-Mysore War
 Siege of Coimbatore (1791) – Third Anglo-Mysore War
 Siege of Goorumconda (1791) – Third Anglo-Mysore War

 Siege of Nundydroog (1791) – Third Anglo-Mysore War
 Siege of Savendroog (1791) – Third Anglo-Mysore War
 Siege of Seringapatam (1792) – Third Anglo-Mysore War
 Siege of Thionville (1792) – War of the First Coalition
 Battle of Verdun (1792) – War of the First Coalition
 Siege of Lille (1792) – War of the First Coalition
 Siege of Mainz (1792) – War of the First Coalition
 Battle of Limburg (1792) – War of the First Coalition
 Siege of Maastricht (1793) – War of the First Coalition
 Siege of Condé (1793) – War of the First Coalition
 Siege of Mainz (1793) – War of the First Coalition
 Siege of Bellegarde (1793) – War of the First Coalition
 Siege of Valenciennes (1793) – War of the First Coalition
 Siege of Pondicherry (1793) – War of the First Coalition
 Siege of Lyon (1793) – War of the First Coalition
 Siege of Landau (1793) – War of the First Coalition

 Siege of Dunkirk (1793) – War of the First Coalition
 Siege of Le Quesnoy (1793) – War of the First Coalition
 Siege of Toulon (1793) – War of the First Coalition
 Siege of Maubeuge (1793) – War of the First Coalition
 Siege of Fort-Louis (1793) – War of the First Coalition
 Siege of Angers (1793) – War of the First Coalition
 Siege of San Fiorenzo (1794) – War of the First Coalition
 Siege of Bastia (1794) – War of the First Coalition
 Siege of Landrecies (1794) – War of the First Coalition
 Siege of Collioure (1794) – War of the First Coalition
 Siege of Ypres (1794) – War of the First Coalition
 Siege of Calvi (1794) – War of the First Coalition
 Siege of Luxembourg (1794–95) – War of the First Coalition
 Siege of Roses (1794–95) – War of the First Coalition

 Siege of Mannheim (1795) – War of the First Coalition
 Siege of Mantua (1796–97) – War of the First Coalition, French besieging
 Siege of Kehl (1796–97) – War of the First Coalition
 Siege of Hüningen (1796–97) – War of the First Coalition
 Siege of Port of Spain (1797), during the Anglo-Spanish War
 Siege of San Juan de Puerto Rico (1797), during the Anglo-Spanish War
 Siege of Malta (1798–1800), during the French Revolutionary Wars
 Siege of Corfu (1798–99) – War of the Second Coalition
 Siege of El Arish (1799) – French campaign in Egypt and Syria
 Siege of Jaffa (1799) – French campaign in Egypt and Syria
 Siege of Acre (1799) – French campaign in Egypt and Syria
 Siege of Mantua (1799) – War of the Second Coalition
 Siege of Seringapatam (1799) – Fourth Anglo-Mysore War

Modern military sieges

19th century 
 Siege of Genoa (1800) – War of the Second Coalition
 Siege of Fort Bard (1800) – War of the Second Coalition
 Siege of Fort Julien (1801) – French campaign in Egypt and Syria
 Siege of Porto Ferrajo (1801) – War of the Second Coalition
 Siege of Alexandria (1801) – French campaign in Egypt and Syria
 Siege of Ahmednagar (1803) – Second Anglo-Maratha War
 Siege of Aligarh (1803) – Second Anglo-Maratha War
 Siege of Erivan (1804) – Russo-Persian War (1804–13)
 Siege of Delhi (1804) – Second Anglo-Maratha War
 Siege of Deeg (1804) – Second Anglo-Maratha War

 Siege of Bharatpur (1805) – Second Anglo-Maratha War
 Siege of Santo Domingo (1805)
 Siege of Gaeta (1806) – Invasion of Naples (1806)
 Siege of Magdeburg (1806) – War of the Fourth Coalition
 Siege of Belgrade (1806) – First Serbian uprising
 Siege of Hameln (1806) – War of the Fourth Coalition
 Siege of Stralsund (1807) – War of the Fourth Coalition
 Siege of Montevideo (1807) – during the British invasions of the River Plate
 Siege of Kolberg (1807) – War of the Fourth Coalition
 Siege of Danzig (1807) – War of the Fourth Coalition, French siege of Prussians and Russians
 Siege of Buenos Aires (1807) – during the British invasions of the River Plate
 Battle of Copenhagen (1807) – Bombarded by British fleet and by ground forces commanded by Arthur Wellesley

 Siege of Sveaborg (1808) – Finnish War
 Siege of Erivan (1808) – Russo-Persian War (1804–13)
 First siege of Zaragoza (1808) – Peninsular War
 Siege of Barcelona (1808) – Peninsular War
 Battle of Valencia (1808) – Peninsular War
 Second siege of Gerona (1808) – Peninsular War
 Siege of Roses (1808) – Peninsular War
 Second siege of Zaragoza (1808–1809) – Peninsular War
 Siege of Chaves (1809) – Peninsular War
 Third siege of Girona (1809) – Peninsular War
 Siege of Cádiz (1810–1812) – Peninsular War
 Siege of Santa Maura (1810) – Adriatic campaign
 Siege of Astorga (1810) – Peninsular War
 Siege of Lérida (1810) – Peninsular War
 First siege of Ciudad Rodrigo (1810) – Peninsular War by the French Marshal Michel Ney
 Siege of Mequinenza (1810) – Peninsular War
 Siege of Almeida (1810) – Peninsular War
 Siege of Tortosa (1810–11) – Peninsular War
 Siege of Olivenza (1811) – Peninsular War
 First siege of Badajoz (1811) – Peninsular War
 Siege of Figueras (1811) – Peninsular War
 Second siege of Badajoz (1811) – Peninsular War
 Siege of Tarragona (1811) – Peninsular War
 Siege of Valencia (Venezuela) (es) (1811) – Spanish American wars of independence
 First siege of Montevideo (1811) – Spanish American wars of independence
 Siege of Tarifa (1811–1812) – Peninsular War
 Siege of Valencia (1811–1812) – Peninsular War
 Second siege of Montevideo (1812–14) – Spanish American wars of independence
 Second siege of Ciudad Rodrigo (1812) – Peninsular War by Arthur Wellesley
 Siege of Cuautla (1812) – Mexican War of Independence
 Siege of Badajoz (1812) – Peninsular War
 Siege of Huajuapan de León (1812) – Mexican War of Independence
 Siege of the Salamanca Forts (1812) – Peninsular War
 Siege of Astorga (1812) – Peninsular War
 First siege of Puerto Cabello (es) (1812) – Spanish American wars of independence

 Siege of Riga (1812) – French invasion of Russia
 Siege of Fort Mackinac (1812) – War of 1812
 Siege of Detroit (1812) – War of 1812
 Siege of Fort Harrison (1812) – War of 1812
 Siege of Fort Wayne (1812) – War of 1812
 Siege of Burgos (1812) – Peninsular War
 Siege of Danzig (1813) – War of the Sixth Coalition
 Siege of Acapulco (1813) – Mexican War of Independence
 Siege of Fort Meigs (1813) – failed British siege of American garrison during the War of 1812
 Siege of Tarragona (1813) – Peninsular War
 Siege of Pamplona (1813) – Peninsular War
 Siege of San Sebastián (1813) – Peninsular War
 Siege of Chillán (1813) – Chilean War of Independence
 Second siege of Puerto Cabello (es) (1813) – Spanish American wars of independence
 Siege of Cattaro (1813–1814) – War of the Sixth Coalition
 Siege of Mainz (1813–1814) – War of the Sixth Coalition
 Siege of Zara (1813) – War of the Sixth Coalition
 Siege of Maturin (es) (1813–1814) – Spanish American wars of independence
 Siege of Hamburg (1813–1814) – War of the Sixth Coalition
 Siege of Metz (1814) – War of the Sixth Coalition
 Third siege of Puerto Cabello (es) (1814) – Spanish American wars of independence
 Siege of Antwerp (1814) – War of the Sixth Coalition
 Siege of Ragusa (1814) – War of the Sixth Coalition
 Siege of Bergen op Zoom (1814) – War of the Sixth Coalition
 First siege of Valencia (Venezuela) (es) (1814) – Spanish American wars of independence
 Second siege of Valencia (Venezuela) (es) (1814) – Spanish American wars of independence
 Siege of Prairie du Chien (1814) – War of 1812
 Siege of Fort Erie (1814) – War of 1812
 Siege of Aragua de Barcelona (es) (1814) – Spanish American wars of independence
 Siege of Santa Fe de Bogotá (es) (1814) – Spanish American wars of independence
 Siege of Fort St. Philip (1815) – War of 1812
 Siege of Ancona (1815) – Neapolitan War
 Siege of Gaeta (1815) – Neapolitan War
 Siege of Cartagena de Indias (es) (1815) – Spanish American wars of independence
 First siege of Angostura (es) (1817) – Spanish American wars of independence
  (1817) – Spanish American wars of independence
 Second siege of Angostura (es) (1817) – Spanish American wars of independence
 Siege of Cartagena de Indias (es) (1820–21) – Spanish American wars of independence
 First siege of El Callao (es) (1821) – Spanish American wars of independence
 Siege of Tripolitsa (1821) – by the Greeks against the Ottomans, during the Greek War of Independence
 Siege of the Acropolis (1821–22) – by the Greeks against the Ottomans, during the Greek War of Independence
 Fourth siege of Puerto Cabello (es) (1822) – Spanish American wars of independence
 Siege of Pasto (es) (1822) – Spanish American wars of independence
 Fifth Siege of Puerto Cabello (1823) – Spanish American wars of independence
 Siege of Pamplona (1823) – 1823 French invasion of Spain
 First, second, and third sieges of Missolonghi (1822, 1823, 1825–1826)
 Second siege of El Callao (es) (1824–1826) – Spanish American wars of independence
 Siege of the Acropolis (1826–27) – by the Ottomans against the Greeks, during the Greek War of Independence
 Siege of Antwerp (1832) – conducted by French forces against a Dutch garrison after the Ten Days' Campaign.
 Siege of Jerusalem (1834) Peasants' Revolt of 1834 (Palestine)
 Siege of Puerto Cabello (es)  (1835) – Reforms Revolution (Venezuela)
 Siege of the Alamo (1836) – Texas Revolution
 Siege of Herat (1837–38)
 Third siege of El Callao (es) (1838)
 Siege of Akhoulgo (1839)
 Great Siege of Montevideo (1843–1851)
 Siege of Fort Texas (1846) – Mexican–American War

 Siege of Los Angeles (1846) – Mexican–American War
 Siege of Pueblo de Taos (1847) – Mexican–American War
 Siege of Puebla (1847) – Mexican–American War
 Siege of Veracruz (1847) – Mexican–American War. First U.S. amphibious landing
 Siege of San José del Cabo (1848) – Mexican–American War
 Siege of Peschiera del Garda (1848) – Italian Risorgimento
 Siege of Osoppo (1848) – Italian Risorgimento
 Siege of Venice (1849) – Italian Risorgimento
 Siege of Rome (1849) – Italian Risorgimento
 Siege of Buda (1849) – during the Hungarian Revolution of 1848–49
 Siege of La Serena (1851) – 1851 Chilean Revolution
 Siege of Calafat (1854) – Crimean War

 Siege of Petropavlovsk-Kamchatsky (1854)
 Siege of Sevastopol (1854–55) – Crimean War
 Siege of Taganrog (1855) – Crimean War
 Siege of Kars (1855) – Crimean War
 Siege of Medina Fort (1857) – Toucouleurs besiege French for 97 days
 Siege of Delhi (1857) – Indian Rebellion of 1857
 Siege of Cawnpore (1857) – Indian Rebellion of 1857
 Siege of Lucknow (1857) – Indian Rebellion of 1857
 Siege of Arrah (1857) – Indian Rebellion of 1857
 Siege of Jhansi (1858) – Indian Rebellion of 1857
Siege of Đà Nẵng (1858–1860)
 Siege of Tourane (1858–1860)
 Siege of Saigon (1859)
 Siege of Ancona (1860) – Italian Risorgimento
 Siege of Messina (1860–61) – Italian Risorgimento
 Siege of Civitella del Tronto (1860–61) – Italian Risorgimento
 Siege of Gaeta (1860–1861) – Italian Risorgimento
Siege of Fort Sumter (1861) – Union soldiers in Fort Sumter surrendered after a few days of bombardment by Confederate forces starting the American Civil War.
 Siege of Tubac (1861) – Apache Wars
 Siege of New Orleans (1862) – Union Army besieged a Confederate city in the American Civil War
 Siege of Vicksburg (1863) – Union Army besieged a Confederate city in the American Civil War.
 Siege of Port Hudson (1863) – Union Army surrounded Confederate river stronghold for 48 days.
 Siege of Puebla (1863) – Second French intervention in Mexico
 Siege of Petersburg (1864–1865) – American Civil War
 Siege of Fort Ampola (1866) – Italian Risorgimento
 Fourth siege of El Callao (1866) – naval battle between Spain and Peru (and her allies)
 Siege of Querétaro (1867) – Second French intervention in Mexico
 Siege of Mexico City (1867) – Second French intervention in Mexico
 Siege of Hakodate (1869)

 Capture of Rome (1870) – Italian Risorgimento
 Siege of Strasbourg (1870) – Franco-Prussian War
 Siege of Toul (1870) – Franco-Prussian War
 Siege of Metz (1870) – Franco-Prussian War
 Siege of Paris and the Paris Commune (1870–71)
 Siege of Belfort (1870–71) – Franco-Prussian War
 Siege of Cartagena (1873–1874)
 Siege of Pamplona (1874) – First Spanish Republic
 Siege of Plevna (1877–1878) – Russo-Turkish War (1877–78)
 Siege of the Bears Paw (1877) – final engagement of the Nez Perce War.
 Siege of Eshowe (1879) – Anglo–Zulu War
 Fifth siege of El Callao (1880) – Chilean naval blockade and bombardment of El Callao (Peru), during the War of the Pacific
 Siege of Miraflores (1880) – Chilean siege of Lima (Peru), during the War of the Pacific
 Siege of Marabastad (1881) – First Boer War
 Siege of Khartoum (1884–85) – Mahdist War
 Siege of Tuyên Quang (1884–85) – Sino-French War
Siege of Lapa (1893) – Federalist Revolution
 Siege of Mek'elè (1896) – First Italo-Ethiopian War
 Siege of Santiago (1898) – Spanish–American War
First siege of San Juan (1898) – Spanish–American War
Second siege of San Juan (1898) – Spanish–American War
Siege of Manila (1898) – Spanish–American War
 Siege of Baler (1898–99) – Philippine Revolution
 Siege of Masbate (1898–99) – Philippine Revolution

 Siege of Zamboanga (1898–99) – Philippine Revolution
 Siege of Bucaramanga (1899) – Thousand Days' War (Colombia)
 Siege of Mafeking (1899–1900) – Second Boer War
 Siege of Kimberley (1899–1900) – Second Boer War
 Siege of Ladysmith (1899–1900) – Second Boer War

20th century 
 Siege of the International Legations (1900) – Boxer Rebellion
 Siege of San Cristobal (1901) – Thousand Days' War (Venezuela)
 Siege of La Victoria (1902)- Revolución Libertadora (Venezuela)
 Siege of Puerto Cabello (1902–1903)- Naval blockade of Venezuela
 Siege of La Guaira (1902–1903)- Naval blockade of Venezuela
 Siege of Castle San Carlos (1903)- Naval blockade of Venezuela
 Siege of Ciudad Bolivar (1903)- Revolución Libertadora (Venezuela)
 Siege of Port Arthur (1904–05) Russo-Japanese War
 Siege of Scutari (1912–13) – First Balkan War
 Siege of Adrianople (1912–13) – First Balkan War

 Siege of Vidin (1913) – Second Balkan War
 Siege of Veracruz (1914)
 Battle of Liège (1914)  – World War I
 Siege of Namur (1914) – World War I
 Siege of Maubeuge (1914) – World War I
 Siege of Toma (1914) – World War I
 Siege of Przemyśl (1914–15) – World War I
 Siege of Antwerp (1914) – World War I
 Siege of Tsingtao (1914) – World War I
 Defense of Van (1915) – World War I
 Siege of Novogeorgievsk (1915) – World War I
 Siege of Kut (1915–16) – World War I
 Siege of Medina (1916–19) – World War I
 Battle of Jerusalem (1917) – World War I
 Siege of Najaf (1918) – World War I
 Siege of Aintab (1920–1921) – Franco-Turkish War
 Siege of Perekop (1920) – Russian Civil War
 Siege of Naco (1929) – Escobar Rebellion
 Siege of Cuartel de la Montaña (1936) – Spanish Civil War
 Siege of Cuartel de Loyola (1936) – Spanish Civil War
 Siege of Gijón (1936) – Spanish Civil War
 Siege of Oviedo (1936) – Spanish Civil War
 Siege of the Alcázar (1936) – Second Spanish Republic militias besieged the Alcázar of Toledo in the Spanish Civil War
 Siege of Santuario de Nuestra Señora de la Cabeza (1936–1937) – Spanish Civil War
 Siege of Madrid (1936–1939) – Spanish Civil War
 Siege of Gandesa (1938) – Spanish Civil War
 Siege of Warsaw (1939) – World War II
 Siege of Hegra Fortress (1940) – World War II
 Siege of Calais (1940) – World War II
 Siege of Lille (1940) – World War II
 Siege of Malta (1940–1943)– World War II

 Siege of Giarabub (1940–1941) – World War II
 Siege of Saïo (1941) – World War II
 Siege of Tobruk (1941) – World War II
 Siege of Mogilev (1941) – World War II
 Siege of Odessa (1941) – World War II
 Siege of Leningrad (1941–1944) – also known as the 900-Day Siege, probably the most gruesome in history, World War II.
 Siege of Rogatica (1941) – World War II
 Siege of Sevastopol (1941–1942) – World War II
 Siege of Yenangyaung (1942) – World War II
 Siege of Stalingrad (1942–1943) – World War II
 Siege of Turjak (1943) – World War II
 Siege of Imphal (1944) – World War II
 Siege of Kohima (1944) – World War II
 Siege of Myitkyina (1944) – World War II
 Siege of Mount Song (1944) – World War II
 Siege of Hengyang (1944) – World War II
 Siege of La Rochelle (1944–1945) – World War II
 Siege of Dunkirk (1944–1945) – World War II
 Siege of Bastogne (1944) – World War II
 Siege of Budapest (1944–1945)– World War II
 Siege of Breslau (1945) – World War II
 Siege of Berlin (1945) – World War II
 Siege of Jerusalem (1947–1948) – 1948 Arab–Israeli War – Palestinian Arabs laid siege to the Jewish quarters of Jerusalem, but were driven back. Siege was resumed in May by regular Jordanian and Egyptian forces. Ended in armistice.
 Siege of Changchun (1948) – Chinese Civil War
 Berlin Blockade (1948–49) – No military action, but the tactic to starve a city by cutting her supply lines is a feature of a siege. The famous Berlin Air Lift supplied the city with food, coal, medical supplies and other goods for nearly a year.
 Blockade of Wonsan (1951–53) – Korean War
 Siege of Dien Bien Phu (1954) – Vietnamese Viet Minh forces besieged French forces, effecting a final defeat on France's colonial occupation.
 Siege of Sidi Ifni (1957–58) – Ifni War
 Siege of Jadotville (1961) – Congo Crisis
 Siege of Puerto Cabello (1962) – Venezuelan political crisis
 Siege of Erenköy (1964) – Turkish Cypriots holding out against attacking Greek and Greek Cypriot forces. Turkish invasion of Cyprus
 Encirclement of Jerusalem (1967) – Six-Day War
 Siege of Sana'a (1967–68) – North Yemen Civil War
 Siege of Khe Sanh (1968) – Vietnam War
 Siege of Huế (1968) – Vietnam War
 Siege of Da Nang (1968) – Vietnam War
 Siege of Saigon (1975) – Vietnam War
 Siege of Tel al-Zaatar (1976) – Lebanese Civil War
 Grand Mosque seizure (1979)
 Siege of Khost (1980–91) – Soviet–Afghan War
 Siege of Aleppo (1980) – Islamist uprising in Syria
 Siege of Abadan (1980–81) – Iran–Iraq War
 Siege of Beirut (1982) – 1982 Lebanon War
 Siege of Urgun (1983–84) – Soviet–Afghan War
 Badaber uprising (1985) – Soviet–Afghan War
 War of the Camps (1985–88) – Lebanese Civil War
 Siege of Basra (1987) – Iran–Iraq War
 Siege of Jeffna (1987) – Sri Lankan Civil War
 Battle of Kokavil (1990) – Sri Lankan Civil War
 First Battle of Elephant Pass (1991) – Sri Lankan Civil War
 Siege of Kijevo (1991) – Croatian War of Independence
 Siege of Vukovar (1991) – Croatian War of Independence
 Siege of Dubrovnik (1991–92) – Croatian War of Independence
 Siege of Stepanakert (1991–92) – First Nagorno-Karabakh War
 Siege of Sarajevo (1992–96) – Bosnian War
 Siege of Mostar (1992–93,1993–94) – Bosnian War
 Siege of Doboj (1992) – Bosnian War
 Siege of Bihać (1992–95) – Bosnian War
 Siege of Tkvarcheli (1992–93) – War in Abkhazia (1992–93)
 Siege of Goražde (1992–95) – Bosnian War
 Siege of Srebrenica (1993–1995) – Bosnian War
 Battle of Jaffna (1995) – Sri Lankan Civil War
 Siege of Junik (1998) – Kosovo War
 Battle of Grozny (1999–2000) – Second Chechen War

21st century 
 Siege of Kunduz (2001) – War in Afghanistan (2001–2021)
 Siege of the Church of the Nativity in Bethlehem (2002) – Second Intifada
 Siege of Monrovia (2003) – Second Liberian Civil War
 Siege of Sadr City (2004–2008) – Iraq War
 Siege of Sangin (2006–2007) – War in Afghanistan (2001–2021)
 Siege of Musa Qala (2006) – War in Afghanistan (2001–2021)
 Siege of Al Amarah (2006) – Iraq War
 Siege of UK bases in Basra (2007) – Iraq War
 Siege of Nahr el-Bared (2007) – Lebanon
 Blockade of the Gaza Strip (2007–present) – Gaza Strip
 Siege of Lal Masjid (2007) – War in North-West Pakistan
 Siege of Misrata (2011) – Libyan Civil War
 Siege of Daraa (2011) – Syrian Civil War
 Siege of Homs (2011–2014) – Syrian Civil War
 Siege of Baniyas (2011) – Syrian Civil War
 Siege of Talkalakh (2011) – Syrian Civil War
 Siege of Rastan and Talbiseh (2011) – Syrian Civil War
 Siege of Hama (2011) – Syrian Civil War
 Siege of Latakia (2011) – Syrian Civil War
 Siege of Dammaj (2011–12, 2013–14) – Yemeni Revolution / Houthi insurgency in Yemen
 Siege of Aleppo (2012–2016) – Syrian Civil War
 Siege of Nubl and Al-Zahraa (2012–2016) – Syrian Civil War
 Siege of Menagh Air Base (2012–2013) – Syrian Civil War
 Siege of Bani Walid (2012) – Factional violence in Libya (2011–14)

 First siege of Wadi Deif (2012–2013) – Syrian Civil War
 Zamboanga City crisis (2013) – Moro conflict
 Siege of Eastern Ghouta (2013–2018) – Syrian Civil War
 Siege of PK5 district (2013-2020) – Central African Republic Civil War (2012-present)
 Siege of Wadi Barada (2013–2017) – Syrian Civil War
 Second siege of Wadi Deif (2014) – Syrian Civil War
 Siege of Sloviansk (2014) – Russo-Ukrainian War
 Siege of the Luhansk Border Base (2014) – Russo-Ukrainian War
 Siege of Amirli (2014) – Iraqi Civil War
 Siege of Deir ez-Zor (2014–2017) – Syrian Civil War
 Battle of Ilovaisk (2014) – Russo-Ukrainian War
 Siege of Kobanî (2014–2015) – Syrian Civil War
 Siege of Al-Fu'ah-Kafriya (2015–2017) – Syrian Civil War
 Cizre operation (2015) – Kurdish–Turkish conflict (2015–present)
 Siege of Silvan (2015) – Kurdish–Turkish conflict (2015–present)
 Siege of Sur (2015–2016) – Kurdish–Turkish conflict (2015–present)
 Siege of Cizre (2015–2016) Kurdish–Turkish conflict (2015–present)
 Siege of Fallujah (2016) – Iraqi Civil War

 Siege of Derna (2016–2018) – Libyan Civil War (2014–present)
 Siege of Mosul (2016–2017) – Iraqi Civil War
 Siege of Tabqa (2017) – Syrian Civil War
 Siege of Miraflores (2017) – Venezuelan political and civil Crisis 
 Marawi crisis (2017) – Philippine war against insurgency
 Siege of Sidi Akribesh (2017) – Libyan Civil War (2014–present)
 Siege of Baghuz Fawqani – (2019) Syrian Civil War
 Siege of the Jabara Valley (2019) – Yemeni Civil War
 Siege of Ras al-Ayn – (2019) Syrian Civil War
 Siege of Qamishli and Al-Hasakah (2021) – Syrian Civil War
 Siege of Panjshir (2021) – Aftermath of the War in Afghanistan (2001-2021)
 Siege of Chernihiv (2022) – Russo-Ukrainian War (2022)
 Siege of Mariupol (2022) – Russo-Ukrainian War (2022)

Police sieges
A police siege is a standoff between law enforcement officers and armed criminals, suspects, or protesters.
 Siege of Sidney Street (1911) England
 Attica Siege (1971) United States of America 
 Munich Olympic massacre (1972) Germany
 Wounded Knee Incident (1973) United States of America 
 Norrmalmstorg robbery (1973) famous for the Stockholm syndrome Sweden
 Huntsville Prison siege (1974) United States of America
 Spaghetti House siege (1975) England
 Balcombe Street Siege (1975) England
 Hanafi Siege (1977) United States of America
 MOVE Siege (1978) United States of America 
 Iranian Embassy Siege (1980) England
 Siege of the Libyan Embassy in London (1984) United Kingdom
 Palace of Justice siege (1985) Colombia
 Oka Crisis (1990) Quebec, Canada
 Ruby Ridge Siege (1992) United States of America 
 Waco Siege (1993) United States of America 
 Chiapas conflict (1994–present) Chiapas, Mexico
 Gustafsen Lake Standoff (1995) British Columbia, Canada
 Montana Freemen Siege (1996) United States of America 
 Japanese embassy hostage crisis (1996–1997) Peru
 Republic of Texas Embassy Siege (1997) United States of America 
 Moscow theater hostage crisis (2002) Russia
 Beslan hostage crisis (2004) Russia
 Napier shootings (2009) New Zealand
 Siege of Complexo do Alemão's slums, major urban conflict in Rio de Janeiro (2010) Brazil
 Hectorville siege (2011) Australia
 Wukan protests (2011) China
 Siege of Eker (2012) Bahrain
 Sydney hostage crisis (2014) Australia
 Hypercacher kosher supermarket siege (2015) France
 2016 Yerevan hostage crisis (2016) Armenia
 Kidapawan jail siege (2017) Philippines
 Brighton siege (2017) Australia
 Siege of the Chinese University of Hong Kong (2019)
 Siege of the Hong Kong Polytechnic University (2019)

Other
 Gwangju uprising (1980) South Korea
 Storming of the Legislative Council Complex (2019) Hong Kong

References

Sieges
List